This list comprises anime titles that have been made available in the United States concurrently with its Japanese release, usually via online streaming, along with the source of the release. The list is in chronological order by season, and alphabetical order within each season.

Spring 2008
Blassreiter - Crunchyroll (now licensed by Funimation)
The Tower of Druaga ~Aegis of Uruk~ - Crunchyroll (now licensed by Funimation)

Fall 2008
Linebarrels of Iron - Crunchyroll (now licensed by Funimation)

Winter 2009
Gintama - Crunchyroll
Kurokami - Crunchyroll, ImaginAsian
The Tower of Druaga ~The Sword of Uruk~ - Crunchyroll (now licensed by Funimation)

Spring 2009
Fullmetal Alchemist: Brotherhood - Funimation
Mainichi Kaasan - Crunchyroll
Hayate the Combat Butler!! - Crunchyroll
Naruto Shippuden - Viz Media
Natsu no Arashi! - Crunchyroll
One Piece (since episode 415) - Funimation
Reborn! - Crunchyroll (now licensed by Viz Media)
Ristorante Paradiso - Crunchyroll
Saki - Crunchyroll
Shangri-La - Crunchyroll (now licensed by Funimation)

Summer 2009
Charger Girl Ju-den-chan - Crunchyroll
Kanamemo - Crunchyroll
Modern Magic Made Simple - Crunchyroll
Sweet Blue Flowers - Crunchyroll

Fall 2009
11eyes - Crunchyroll
Asura Cryin' - Crunchyroll
Tatakau Shisho - Crunchyroll
Fairy Tail - Crunchyroll (now licensed by Funimation)
InuYasha: The Final Act - Viz Media
Hanasakeru Seishōnen - Crunchyroll
Heaven's Lost Property - Crunchyroll (now licensed by Funimation)
Miracle Train - Crunchyroll
Mitsudomoe - Crunchyroll
Natsu no Arashi! Akinai-chū - Crunchyroll
Nogizaka Haruka no Himitsu: Purezza - Crunchyroll
Shin Koihime Musō - Crunchyroll
Tegami Bachi - Crunchyroll
Whispered Words - Crunchyroll
Yumeiro Patissiere - Crunchyroll

Winter 2010
Chu-Bra!! - Crunchyroll
Cobra the Animation - Crunchyroll
Durarara!! - Crunchyroll
Hanamaru Kindergarten - Crunchyroll
Omamori Himari - Crunchyroll
Sound of the Sky - Crunchyroll

Spring 2010
Baka and Test - Funimation
Betrayal Knows My Name - Crunchyroll
Bleach - Viz Media
Dance in the Vampire Bund - Funimation
Demon King Daimao - Crunchyroll, Anime Network
Heroman - Crunchyroll
Giant Killing - Crunchyroll
House of Five Leaves - Funimation
Shin Koihime Musō: Otome Tairan - Crunchyroll
Lilpri - Crunchyroll
Rainbow - Funimation
The Tatami Galaxy - Funimation

Summer 2010
Black Butler II - Funimation
Cat Planet Cuties - Crunchyroll (now licensed by Funimation)
Highschool of the Dead - Anime Network
The Legend of the Legendary Heroes - Funimation
Maid Sama! - Anime Network
Nura: Rise of the Yokai Clan - Viz Media
Occult Academy - Crunchyroll
Ōkami-san - Funimation
Sekirei: Pure Engagement - Funimation
Sengoku Basara II - Funimation
Shiki - Funimation
Strike Witches 2 - Crunchyroll (now licensed by Funimation)
Tono to Issho - Crunchyroll

Fall 2010
Fortune Arterial - Crunchyroll
Heaven's Lost Property: Forte - Crunchyroll (now licensed by Funimation)
Princess Jellyfish - Funimation
Oreimo - Anime News Network
Otome Yōkai Zakuro - Crunchyroll
Panty & Stocking with Garterbelt - Crunchyroll (now licensed by Funimation)
Samurai Girls - Anime Network
Squid Girl - Crunchyroll
Super Robot Wars OG: the Inspector - Crunchyroll
Tantei Opera Milky Holmes - Crunchyroll
Togainu no Chi - Anime News Network
The World God Only Knows - Crunchyroll

Winter 2011
Beelzebub - Crunchyroll
Cardfight!! Vanguard - Crunchyroll
Dragon Crisis! - Crunchyroll
Fractale - Funimation
Freezing - Funimation
Gosick - Crunchyroll
Infinite Stratos - Anime Network
Is This a Zombie? - Crunchyroll (now licensed by Funimation)
Level E - Crunchyroll (now licensed by Funimation)
Lilpri Season 2 - Crunchyroll
Mitsudomoe - Crunchyroll
Rio: Rainbow Gate! - Crunchyroll
Wandering Son - Crunchyroll

Spring 2011
Aria the Scarlet Ammo - Funimation
Battle Girls: Time Paradox - Crunchyroll
Blue Exorcist - Crunchyroll
Deadman Wonderland - Crunchyroll (now licensed by Funimation)
[C] - Control - Funimation
Hanasaku Iroha - Crunchyroll
Hoshizora e Kakaru Hashi - Crunchyroll
Lotte no Omocha! - Crunchyroll
Nichijou - Crunchyroll
Sekai-ichi Hatsukoi - Crunchyroll
Sket Dance - Crunchyroll
Steins;Gate - Crunchyroll (now licensed by Funimation)
Tono to Issho - Crunchyroll
Toriko - Funimation
We Without Wings - Crunchyroll (now licensed by Funimation)
The World God Only Knows Season 2 - Crunchyroll

Summer 2011
A Dark Rabbit Has Seven Lives - Crunchyroll
Baka and Test - Summon the Beasts Season 2 - Funimation
Bunny Drop - Crunchyroll
The Idolmaster - Crunchyroll
Kamisama Dolls - Crunchyroll
No. 6 - Crunchyroll
R-15 - Crunchyroll
Sacred Seven - Crunchyroll
The Everyday Tales of a Cat God - Crunchyroll
The Mystic Archives of Dantalian - Crunchyroll
YuruYuri - Crunchyroll

Fall 2011
C³ - Funimation
Chihayafuru - Crunchyroll
Fate/Zero - Crunchyroll
Future Diary - Funimation
Guilty Crown - Funimation
Haganai - Funimation
Horizon in the Middle of Nowhere - Crunchyroll
Hunter × Hunter - Crunchyroll
Kimi to Boku - Crunchyroll
Last Exile: Fam, the Silver Wing - Funimation
Majikoi - Crunchyroll
Maken-ki! - Funimation
Mashiroiro Symphony - Crunchyroll
Persona 4: The Animation - Anime Network
Phi Brain: Puzzle of God - Anime Network
The New Prince of Tennis - Crunchyroll
Sekai-ichi Hatsukoi Season 2 - Crunchyroll
Shakugan no Shana III - Funimation
Squid Girl Season 2 - Crunchyroll
Un-Go - Crunchyroll
Working!! Season 2 - Crunchyroll

Winter 2012 
 Amagami SS+ - Anime Network
 Another - Crunchyroll
 Aquarion Evol - Funimation
 Bodacious Space Pirates - Crunchyroll
 Brave 10 - Crunchyroll
 The Familiar of Zero F - Crunchyroll
 High School DxD - Funimation
 Inu x Boku SS - Crunchyroll
 The Knight in the Area - Crunchyroll
 Lagrange: The Flower of Rin-ne - Viz Media & Hulu
 Listen to Me, Girls. I Am Your Father! - Crunchyroll
 Natsume's Book of Friends Season 4 - Crunchyroll
 Nisemonogatari - Crunchyroll
 Poyopoyo Kansatsu Nikki - Crunchyroll
 Recorder and Randsell - Crunchyroll
 Waiting in the Summer - Crunchyroll

Spring 2012
Accel World - Viz Media & Hulu
Dusk Maiden of Amnesia - Crunchyroll
Eureka Seven: AO - Funimation
Folktales from Japan - Crunchyroll
Hiiro no Kakera - Crunchyroll
Is This a Zombie? of the Dead - Funimation
Jormungand - Funimation
Kids on the Slope - Crunchyroll
Kimi to Boku 2 - Crunchyroll
Kuroko's Basketball - Crunchyroll
Lupin the Third: The Woman Called Fujiko Mine - Funimation
Medaka Box - Crunchyroll
Mysterious Girlfriend X - Crunchyroll
Nyarko-san: Another Crawling Chaos - Crunchyroll
OZMA - Crunchyroll
Phi Brain: Puzzle of God Season 2 - Crunchyroll, Anime Network & Hulu
Polar Bear Cafe - Crunchyroll
Queen's Blade Rebellion - Crunchyroll
Rock Lee & His Ninja Pals - Crunchyroll
Saint Seiya Omega - Crunchyroll
Saki Episode of Side A - Crunchyroll
Sankarea - Funimation
Sengoku Collection - Crunchyroll
Space Brothers - Crunchyroll
Tsuritama - Crunchyroll
Upotte!! - Crunchyroll
Yurumates3Dei - Crunchyroll
Zetman - Viz Media & Hulu

Summer 2012
Aesthetica of a Rogue Hero - Funimation
The Ambition of Oda Nobuna - Crunchyroll
Campione! - Crunchyroll
Chitose Get You!! - Crunchyroll
Dog Days - Crunchyroll
Good Luck Girl! - Funimation
Hakuōki Reimeiroku - Crunchyroll
Horizon in the Middle of Nowhere Season 2 - Crunchyroll
Humanity Has Declined - Crunchyroll
Kingdom - Funimation
Kokoro Connect - Crunchyroll
Lagrange: The Flower of Rin-ne - Viz Media & Hulu
La storia della Arcana Famiglia - Crunchyroll
Moyasimon Returns - Crunchyroll
Muv-Luv Alternative: Total Eclipse - Crunchyroll
Nakaimo - My Sister Is Among Them! - Crunchyroll
Natsuyuki Rendezvous - Crunchyroll
PES: Peace Eco Smile - Crunchyroll
So, I Can't Play H! - Crunchyroll
Sword Art Online - Crunchyroll
Tari Tari - Crunchyroll
Utakoi - Crunchyroll
YuruYuri♪♪ - Crunchyroll

Fall 2012
World War Blue - Crunchyroll
Blast of Tempest - Crunchyroll
Bottom Biting Bug - Crunchyroll
Btooom! - Crunchyroll
Busou Shinki - Anime Network
Code:Breaker - Funimation
Ebiten - Crunchyroll
From the New World - Crunchyroll
Gintama Season 3 - Crunchyroll
Girls und Panzer - Crunchyroll
Hayate the Combat Butler: Can't Take My Eyes Off You - Crunchyroll
Hidamari Sketch × Honeycomb - Anime Network
Hiiro no Kakera Season 2 - Crunchyroll
Ixion Saga DT - Crunchyroll
Jormungand: Perfect Order - Funimation
K - Viz Media
Kamisama Kiss - Funimation
Love, Chunibyo & Other Delusions - Anime Network
Lychee Light Club - Crunchyroll
Magi: The Labyrinth of Magic - Crunchyroll
Medaka Box: Abnormal - Crunchyroll
My Little Monster - Crunchyroll
OniAi - Funimation
The Pet Girl of Sakurasou - Crunchyroll
Psycho-Pass - Funimation
Robotics;Notes - Funimation
Say "I love you". - Crunchyroll
Teekyu - Crunchyroll
To Love Ru Darkness - Anime Network
Wooser's Hand-to-Mouth Life - Crunchyroll

Winter 2013
Ai Mai Mi - Crunchyroll
AKB0048 next stage - Crunchyroll
Amnesia - Crunchyroll
Bakumatsu Gijinden Roman - Crunchyroll
Boku-no-imoutowa"Osaka-okan" - Crunchyroll
Chihayafuru Season 2 - Crunchyroll
Cuticle Detective Inaba - Crunchyroll
Da Capo III - Crunchyroll
Encouragement of Climb - Crunchyroll
gdgd Fairies Season 2 - Crunchyroll
GJ Club - Crunchyroll
Haganai NEXT - Funimation
Hakkenden: Eight Dogs of the East - Crunchyroll
Hetalia: The Beautiful World - Funimation
Ishida & Asakura - Crunchyroll
Kotoura-san - Crunchyroll
Little Busters! (from Episode 14) - Crunchyroll
Love Live! School Idol Project - Crunchyroll
Mangirl! - Crunchyroll
Maoyu - Crunchyroll
Minami-ke: Tadaima - Funimation
Oreshura - Crunchyroll
Problem Children Are Coming from Another World, Aren't They? - Crunchyroll
PUCHIM@S - Funimation
Sasami-san@Ganbaranai - Anime Network
Senyu - Crunchyroll
Senran Kagura - Funimation
Student Council's Discretion Level 2 - Crunchyroll
Straight Title Robot Anime - Crunchyroll
Tamako Market - Anime Network

Spring 2013
A Certain Scientific Railgun S - Funimation
Aiura - Crunchyroll
Arata: The Legend - Crunchyroll
Attack on Titan - Crunchyroll & Funimation
Date A Live - Funimation
The Devil Is a Part-Timer! - Funimation
Devil Survivor 2: The Animation - Crunchyroll
The Flowers of Evil - Crunchyroll
Gargantia on the Verdurous Planet - Crunchyroll
Hayate the Combat Butler: Cuties - Crunchyroll
HENNEKO – The Hentai Prince and the Stony Cat - Crunchyroll
Karneval - Funimation
Leviathan: The Last Defense - Crunchyroll
Majestic Prince - Crunchyroll
Muromi-san - Crunchyroll
Mushibugyo - Crunchyroll
My Teen Romantic Comedy SNAFU - Crunchyroll
Nyarko-san: Another Crawling Chaos W - Crunchyroll
Oreimo Season 2 - Crunchyroll
Photo Kano - Crunchyroll
Red Data Girl - Funimation
Samurai Bride - Crunchyroll
The Severing Crime Edge - Crunchyroll
Sparrow's Hotel - Crunchyroll
Uta no Prince-sama Season 2 - Crunchyroll
Valvrave the Liberator - Crunchyroll
Yuyushiki - Crunchyroll

Summer 2013
Blood Lad - Viz Media
Brothers Conflict - Funimation
Chronicles of the Going Home Club - Crunchyroll
Danganronpa: The Animation - Funimation
Day Break Illusion - Crunchyroll
Dog & Scissors - Crunchyroll
The Eccentric Family - Crunchyroll
Fantasista Doll - Crunchyroll
Fate/kaleid liner Prisma Illya - Crunchyroll
Free! - Iwatobi Swim Club - Crunchyroll
Gatchaman Crowds - Crunchyroll
Genshiken Second Season - Crunchyroll
Gifu Dodo!! Kanetsugu and Keiji - Crunchyroll
Hakkenden: Eight Dogs of the East Season 2 - Crunchyroll
High School DxD New - Funimation
Hyperdimension Neptunia - Funimation
Kinmoza! - Crunchyroll
Love Lab - Crunchyroll
Makai Ouji: Devils and Realist - Crunchyroll
Monogatari Series Second Season - Crunchyroll & Daisuki
Recorder to Randoseru Mi♪ - Crunchyroll
Rozen Maiden: Zurückspulen - Crunchyroll
Senyu Season 2 - Crunchyroll
Servant x Service - Crunchyroll
Silver Spoon - Crunchyroll
Stella Women’s Academy, High School Division Class C³ - Crunchyroll
Sunday Without God - Crunchyroll
Teekyu Season 2 - Crunchyroll
WataMote - Crunchyroll
The World God Only Knows: Goddesses - Crunchyroll
Yamishibai: Japanese Ghost Stories - Crunchyroll

Fall 2013
Ace of Diamond - Crunchyroll
Arpeggio of Blue Steel - Crunchyroll
Beyond the Boundary - Crunchyroll
BlazBlue Alter Memory - Funimation
Bottom Biting Bug Season 2 - Crunchyroll
Coppelion - Viz Media
Diabolik Lovers - Crunchyroll
Freezing Vibration - Funimation
Galilei Donna - Crunchyroll
Gingitsune - Crunchyroll
Golden Time - Crunchyroll
Gundam Build Fighters - YouTube, Gundam.info
Hajime No Ippo: The Fighting! - Crunchyroll
I Couldn't Become a Hero, So I Reluctantly Decided to Get a Job. - Crunchyroll
Infinite Stratos 2 - Crunchyroll
Kill la Kill - Crunchyroll
Kuroko's Basketball Season 2 - Crunchyroll
Kyousougiga - Crunchyroll
Little Busters! Refrain - Crunchyroll
Log Horizon - Crunchyroll
Magi: The Kingdom of Magic - Crunchyroll
Meganebu! - Crunchyroll
Miss Monochrome: The Animation - Crunchyroll
My Mental Choices Are Completely Interfering with My School Romantic Comedy - Crunchyroll
Nagi-Asu: A Lull in the Sea - Crunchyroll
Non Non Biyori - Crunchyroll
Outbreak Company - Crunchyroll
Phi Brain: Puzzle of God Season 3 - Crunchyroll
Samurai Flamenco - Crunchyroll
Strike the Blood - Crunchyroll
Teekyu Season 3 - Crunchyroll
Tokyo Ravens - Funimation
Unbreakable Machine-Doll - Funimation
Valvrave the Liberator Season 2 - Crunchyroll
Walkure Romanze - Crunchyroll
Wanna be the Strongest in the World - Crunchyroll (now licensed by Funimation)
White Album 2 - Crunchyroll
Yowamushi Pedal - Crunchyroll

Winter 2014
Buddy Complex - Funimation & Daisuki
D-Frag! - Funimation
Engaged to the Unidentified - Crunchyroll
Future Card Buddyfight - YouTube & Hulu
Hamatora: The Animation - Crunchyroll
Hozuki's Coolheadedness - Crunchyroll
Inari, Konkon, Koi Iroha - Funimation
Love, Chunibyo & Other Delusions Ren - Crunchyroll
Magical Warfare - Crunchyroll
Maken-Ki! Two - Funimation
My Neighbor Seki - Crunchyroll
Nisekoi - Crunchyroll & Daisuki
Nobunaga the Fool - Crunchyroll
Nobunagun - Crunchyroll & Funimation
Noragami - Funimation
No-Rin - Funimation
Oneechan ga Kita - Crunchyroll
The Pilot's Love Song - Crunchyroll
Pupa - Crunchyroll
Recently, My Sister Is Unusual - Crunchyroll
Robot Girls Z - Crunchyroll
Saki: The Nationals - Crunchyroll
Sakura Trick - Crunchyroll
Seitokai Yakuindomo* - Crunchyroll
Silver Spoon Season 2 - Crunchyroll
Space☆Dandy - Funimation & Adult Swim
Soni-Ani SUPER SONICO THE ANIMATION - Crunchyroll
Strange+ - Crunchyroll
Wake Up, Girls! - Crunchyroll
Witch Craft Works - Crunchyroll
Wizard Barristers - Crunchyroll
Wonder Momo - Crunchyroll
Wooser's Hand-to-Mouth Life: Awakening Arc - Crunchyroll
World Conquest Zvezda Plot - Crunchyroll & Daisuki
Z/X Ignition - Crunchyroll

Spring 2014
Baby Steps - Crunchyroll
Black Bullet - Crunchyroll
Blade & Soul - Crunchyroll
Brynhildr in the Darkness - Crunchyroll
Captain Earth - Crunchyroll
Chaika - The Coffin Princess - Crunchyroll
The Comic Artist and Assistants - Crunchyroll
Daimidaler the Sound Robot - Funimation
Dai-Shogun - Great Revolution - Crunchyroll
Date A Live II - Funimation
Dragonar Academy - Funimation
Dragon Collection - Crunchyroll
Fairy Tail Season 2 - Funimation & Crunchyroll
The File of Kindaichi Returns - Crunchyroll
Haikyū!! - Crunchyroll
Hero Bank - Crunchyroll
If Her Flag Breaks - Crunchyroll
Inugami-san to Nekoyama-san - Crunchyroll
The Irregular at Magic High School - Crunchyroll, Daisuki, Hulu & Aniplex
Is the Order a Rabbit? - Crunchyroll
JoJo's Bizarre Adventure: Stardust Crusaders - Crunchyroll
Kamigami no Asobi - Crunchyroll
The Kawai Complex Guide to Manors and Hostel Behavior - Crunchyroll
La Corda d'Oro Blue Sky - Crunchyroll
Love Live! School Idol Project Season 2 - Crunchyroll
M3 the dark metal - Daisuki
Magica Wars - Crunchyroll
Majin Bone - Crunchyroll
Mekakucity Actors - Crunchyroll, Daisuki, Hulu & Aniplex
MUSHI-SHI: The Next Passage - Crunchyroll
Nanana's Buried Treasure - Crunchyroll
No Game No Life - Crunchyroll
One Week Friends - Crunchyroll
Oreca Battle - Crunchyroll
Ping Pong: The Animation - Funimation
PUCHIM@S 2 - Funimation
Riddle Story of Devil - Funimation
Rowdy Sumo Wrestler Matsutaro!! - Crunchyroll
Selector Infected WIXOSS - Funimation
Soul Eater Not! - Funimation
The World is Still Beautiful - Crunchyroll

Summer 2014
Ai-Mai-Mi Mousou Catastrophe - Crunchyroll
Akame ga Kill! - Crunchyroll
Aldnoah.Zero - Crunchyroll, Daisuki, Hulu & Aniplex
Argevollen - Crunchyroll
Barakamon - Funimation
Black Butler: Book of Circus - Funimation & Daisuki
Bladedance of Elementalers - Crunchyroll
Blue Spring Ride - Crunchyroll
Dramatical Murder - Crunchyroll
Encouragement of Climb Season 2 - Crunchyroll
Fate/Kaleid Liner Prisma Illya 2wei! - Crunchyroll
Free! Eternal Summer - Crunchyroll & Funimation
Glasslip - Crunchyroll
Hanayamata - Crunchyroll
Hanamonogatari - Crunchyroll, Daisuki, Hulu & Aniplex
Invaders of the Rokujyōma!? - Crunchyroll
Locodol - Crunchyroll
Love Stage!! - Crunchyroll
Magimoji Rurumo - Crunchyroll
Momo Kyun Sword - Crunchyroll
Nobunaga Concerto - Crunchyroll
Monthly Girls' Nozaki-kun - Crunchyroll
Persona 4: The Golden Animation - Crunchyroll, Daisuki, Hulu & Aniplex
Rail Wars! - Crunchyroll
Re:_Hamatora - Crunchyroll
Sabagebu! - Crunchyroll
Sailor Moon Crystal - Viz Media & Crunchyroll
Samurai Jam -Bakumatsu Rock- - Crunchyroll
Sengoku Basara: Judge End - Funimation
Shōnen Hollywood - Funimation
Space☆Dandy 2 - Funimation & Adult Swim
Shin Strange + - Crunchyroll
Sword Art Online II - Crunchyroll & Daisuki
Terror in Resonance - Funimation
Tokyo ESP - Funimation
Tokyo Ghoul - Funimation
Yamishibai: Japanese Ghost Stories 2 - Crunchyroll

Fall 2014
A Good Librarian Like a Good Shepherd - Funimation
Akatsuki no Yona - Crunchyroll & Funimation
Bonjour Sweet Love Patisserie - Crunchyroll
Bottom Biting Bug Season 3 - Crunchyroll
Case Closed (since episode 754) - Crunchyroll
Celestial Method - Crunchyroll
Chaika -The Coffin Princess- AVENGING BATTLE - Crunchyroll
CROSS ANGE Rondo of Angel and Dragon - Crunchyroll
DENKI-GAI - Crunchyroll
Fate/stay night: Unlimited Blade Works - Crunchyroll, Hulu & Aniplex
The Fruit of Grisaia - Crunchyroll
Garo: The Animation - Funimation
Girl Friend Beta - Crunchyroll
Gonna be the Twin-Tails!! - Funimation
Gugure! Kokkuri-san - Crunchyroll
Hi-sCool! Seha Girls - Crunchyroll
I Can't Understand What My Husband Is Saying - Crunchyroll
In Search of the Lost Future - Funimation
Joker - Crunchyroll
Karen Senki - Crunchyroll
Laughing Under the Clouds - Funimation
Log Horizon Season 2 - Crunchyroll
Lord Marksman and Vanadis - Funimation
MUSHI-SHI The Next Passage Season 2 - Crunchyroll
Orenchi no Furo Jijō - Crunchyroll
Parasyte -the maxim- - Crunchyroll
Psycho-Pass 2 - Funimation
Rage of Bahamut: Genesis - Funimation
selector spread WIXOSS - Funimation
Shirobako - Crunchyroll
Terra Formars - Crunchyroll
Tribe Cool Crew - Crunchyroll
Trinity Seven - Crunchyroll
When Supernatural Battles Became Commonplace - Crunchyroll
Wolf Girl and Black Prince - Crunchyroll
World Trigger - Crunchyroll
Your Lie in April - Crunchyroll, Hulu & Aniplex
Yowamushi Pedal Grande Road - Crunchyroll
Yuki Yuna is a Hero - Crunchyroll

Winter 2015
Absolute Duo - Funimation
Aldnoah.Zero Season 2 - Crunchyroll, Hulu, Aniplex & Daisuki
Assassination Classroom - Funimation
Cute High Earth Defense Club Love! - Crunchyroll & Funimation
Death Parade - Funimation
Dog Days - Crunchyroll
Durarara!!x2 Shou - Crunchyroll, Hulu, Aniplex, Daisuki
Fafner Exodus - Crunchyroll
Gourmet Girl Graffiti - Crunchyroll
Isuca - Crunchyroll
JoJo’s Bizarre Adventure: Stardust Crusaders - Battle in Egypt - Crunchyroll
Kamisama Kiss Season 2 - Funimation
KanColle - Crunchyroll
Kuroko's Basketball Season 3 - Daisuki & Crunchyroll
Maria the Virgin Witch - Funimation
Military! - Crunchyroll
Rolling☆Girls - Funimation
Saekano: How to Raise a Boring Girlfriend - Crunchyroll, Hulu & Aniplex
Samurai Warriors - Funimation & Crunchyroll
Shōnen Hollywood -Holly Stage for 50- - Funimation
The Idolmaster Cinderella Girls - Daisuki
The Testament of Sister New Devil - Crunchyroll
Tokyo Ghoul √A - Funimation
Tsukimonogatari - Daisuki
Unlimited Fafnir - Crunchyroll
World Break: Aria of Curse for a Holy Swordsman - Funimation & Crunchyroll
Yatterman Night - Funimation
Yurikuma Arashi - Funimation

Spring 2015
Ace of Diamond: Second Season - Crunchyroll
Baby Steps Season 2 - Crunchyroll
Blood Blockade Battlefront - Funimation & Hulu
The Disappearance of Nagato Yuki-chan - Funimation & Hulu
Fate/stay night: Unlimited Blade Works Season 2 - Crunchyroll, Daisuki, Hulu, Aniplex
Food Wars: Shokugeki no Soma - Crunchyroll
The Eden of Grisaia - Crunchyroll
The Labyrinth of Grisaia - Crunchyroll
Gintama° - Crunchyroll
Gunslinger Stratos: THE ANIMATION - Crunchyroll, Daisuki, Hulu & Aniplex
The Heroic Legend of Arslan - Funimation & Hulu
Hello!! Kinmoza! - Crunchyroll 
High School DxD BorN - Funimation
I Can't Understand What My Husband is Saying: 2nd Thread - Crunchyroll
Is It Wrong to Try to Pick Up Girls in a Dungeon? - Crunchyroll
Joker Season 2 - Crunchyroll
Mikagura School Suite - Funimation
My Love Story!! - Crunchyroll
My Teen Romantic Comedy SNAFU TOO! - Crunchyroll
Ninja Slayer - Funimation
Nisekoi: - Crunchyroll, Daisuki, Hulu & Aniplex
Plastic Memories - Crunchyroll, Daisuki, Hulu & Aniplex
Punch Line - Crunchyroll
Rainy Cocoa - Funimation
Re-Kan! - Crunchyroll
Rin-ne - Crunchyroll
Saint Seiya: Soul of Gold - Crunchyroll & Daisuki
Seraph of the End - Funimation & Hulu
Show by Rock!! - Funimation
Sushi and Beyond - Viewster
Sound! Euphonium - Crunchyroll
Takamiya Nasuno Desu! - Crunchyroll
Teekyu Season 4 - Crunchyroll
Tesagure! Bukatsu-mono Season 3 - Crunchyroll
Triage X - Crunchyroll
Ultimate Otaku Teacher - Funimation
Urawa no Usagi-chan - Crunchyroll
Uta no☆Prince-sama Revolutions - Crunchyroll
Wish Upon the Pleiades - Crunchyroll
Yamada-kun and the Seven Witches - Crunchyroll

Summer 2015
Actually, I Am - Crunchyroll
Aoharu x Machinegun - Crunchyroll
Aquarion Logos - Funimation, Hulu
Bikini Warriors - Funimation, Hulu
Castle Town Dandelion - Funimation, Hulu
Chaos Dragon - Funimation, Hulu
Charlotte - Crunchyroll, Hulu, Aniplex, Viewster & Daisuki
Classroom Crisis - Crunchyroll, Hulu, Aniplex, Viewster & Daisuki
Danchigai - Crunchyroll
Durarara!!x2 Ten - Crunchyroll, Hulu, Aniplex, Daisuki
Fate/Kaleid Liner Prisma Illya 2wei Herz! - Crunchyroll
Gangsta. - Funimation, Hulu
Gatchaman Crowds Insight - Crunchyroll
GATE - Crunchyroll
God Eater - Daisuki, Hulu
Hetalia: The World Twinkle - Funimation, Hulu
Himōto! Umaru-chan - Crunchyroll
The Idolmaster Cinderella Girls Season 2 - Daisuki, Hulu
Junjo Romantica 3 - Funimation, Hulu
Makura no Danshi - Crunchyroll
Million Doll - Crunchyroll
Miss Monochrome - The Animation Season 2 - Crunchyroll
Monster Musume - Crunchyroll
My Wife is the Student Council President - Crunchyroll
Non Non Biyori Repeat - Crunchyroll
Overlord - Funimation, Hulu
Prison School - Funimation, Hulu
Rampo Kitan: Game of Laplace - Funimation, Hulu
Rokka: Braves of the Six Flowers - Crunchyroll
School-Live! - Crunchyroll
Seiyu's Life! - Funimation, Hulu
Shimoneta: A Boring World Where the Concept of Dirty Jokes Doesn’t Exist - Funimation, Hulu
Sky Wizards Academy - Funimation, Hulu
Snow White with the Red Hair - Funimation, Hulu
Symphogear GX - Crunchyroll
Teekyu Season 5 - Crunchyroll
To Love Ru Darkness 2nd - Crunchyroll
Ushio and Tora - Crunchyroll
Venus Project: Climax - Funimation, Hulu
Wagnaria!! 3 - Crunchyroll, Hulu, Aniplex, Viewster & Daisuki
Wakaba＊Girl - Crunchyroll
Wooser's Hand-to-Mouth Life: Phantasmagoric Arc - Crunchyroll

Fall 2015
Ani Tore! EX - Crunchyroll
Anti-Magic Academy: The 35th Test Platoon - Crunchyroll
Aria the Scarlet Ammo AA - Funimation
The Asterisk War - Crunchyroll, Daisuki & Funimation
Attack on Titan: Junior High - Funimation
Beautiful Bones: Sakurako's Investigation - Crunchyroll
Cardfight!! Vanguard G GIRS Crisis - Daisuki
Chivalry of a Failed Knight - Hulu
Comet Lucifer - Crunchyroll
Concrete Revolutio - Daisuki & Funimation
Dance with Devils - Funimation
DD Fist of the North Star - Crunchyroll
Diabolik Lovers More, Blood - Crunchyroll
Doamayger-D - Funimation
Fafner Exodus Season 2 - Crunchyroll
The File of Young Kindaichi Returns Season 2 - Crunchyroll
Garo: Crimson Moon - Funimation
Hacka Doll the Animation - Crunchyroll & Daisuki
Haikyū!! Season 2 - Crunchyroll
Heavy Object - Funimation
Hokuto no Ken: Ichigo Aji - Crunchyroll
Is the Order a Rabbit? Season 2 - Crunchyroll
K: Return of Kings - Hulu, Neon Alley
Kagewani - Crunchyroll
Komori-san Can't Decline - Crunchyroll
Lance N' Masques - Crunchyroll
Lovely Muuuuuuuco! - Crunchyroll
Magical Somera-chan - Crunchyroll
Miss Monochrome: The Animation Season 3 - Crunchyroll
Mobile Suit Gundam: Iron-Blooded Orphans - Daisuki, Hulu, Crunchyroll & Funimation
Noragami Aragoto - Funimation
One-Punch Man - Daisuki, Viz Media/Hulu
Onsen Yōsei Hakone-chan - Crunchyroll
Owarimonogatari - Crunchyroll & Daisuki
The Perfect Insider - Crunchyroll
Rainy Cocoa, Welcome to Rainy Color - Funimation
Riddle Story of Devil - Funimation
Seraph of the End: Battle in Nagoya - Funimation
Shomin Sample - Funimation
STARMYU - Funimation
Teekyu Season 6 - Crunchyroll
The Testament of Sister New Devil BURST - Crunchyroll
Utawarerumono: Itsuwari no Kamen - Crunchyroll
Valkyrie Drive: Mermaid - Funimation
Young Black Jack - Crunchyroll

Winter 2016
Active Raid - Crunchyroll
Aokana: Four Rhythm Across the Blue - Crunchyroll
Assassination Classroom Season 2 - Funimation
BBK/BRNK - Crunchyroll
Dagashi Kashi - Funimation
Descending Stories: Showa Genroku Rakugo Shinju - Crunchyroll
Dimension W - Funimation & Adult Swim
Divine Gate - Funimation
Durarara!! x2 Ketsu - Crunchyroll, Funimation, Aniplex, Hulu, Daisuki
Erased - Crunchyroll & Funimation
Gate Season 2 - Crunchyroll
Girls Beyond the Wasteland - Hulu & Anime Network
Grimgar of Fantasy and Ash - Funimation
Haruchika - Funimation
KonoSuba: God's Blessing on This Wonderful World! - Crunchyroll
Luck & Logic - Funimation
Mahou Shoujo Nante Mouiidesukara - Crunchyroll
Myriad Colors Phantom World - Crunchyroll
Norn9 - Hulu & Anime Network
Nurse Witch Komugi R - Crunchyroll
Ojisan and Marshmallow - Crunchyroll
Ooya-san wa Shishunki! - Crunchyroll
Pandora in the Crimson Shell: Ghost Urn - Funimation
Phantasy Star Online 2 The Animation - Crunchyroll
Please Tell Me! Galko-chan - Crunchyroll
Prince of Stride: Alternative - Funimation
Rainbow Days - Funimation
Schwarzes Marken - Crunchyroll
Sekkō Boys - Crunchyroll
Snow White with the Red Hair Season 2 - Funimation
Tabi Machi Late Show - Crunchyroll
Teekyu Season 7 - Crunchyroll
Undefeated Bahamut Chronicle - Hulu
Yamishibai: Japanese Ghost Stories 3 - Crunchyroll

Spring 2016
Ace Attorney - Crunchyroll
And you thought there is never a girl online? - Funimation
Anne Happy - Crunchyroll
The Asterisk War Season 2 - Crunchyroll, Funimation, Hulu, Daisuki & Aniplex
Bakuon!! - Crunchyroll
Big Order - Crunchyroll
Brotherhood: Final Fantasy XV - Crunchyroll
Bungo Stray Dogs - Crunchyroll
Cerberus - Crunchyroll
Concrete Revolutio Season 2 - Funimation
Crane Game Girls - Crunchyroll
Endride - Funimation
Flying Witch - Crunchyroll
Future Card Buddyfight Triple D - Crunchyroll & YouTube
High School Fleet - Crunchyroll, Funimation & Daisuki
Haven't You Heard? I'm Sakamoto - Crunchyroll
Hundred - Crunchyroll
JoJo's Bizarre Adventure: Diamond Is Unbreakable - Crunchyroll, Hulu & Neon Alley
Kabaneri of the Iron Fortress - Amazon Prime Video
Kuma Miko: Girl Meets Bear - Funimation
Joker Season 3 - Crunchyroll
Joker Game - Crunchyroll
Kagewani Season 2 - Crunchyroll
Kiznaiver - Crunchyroll
The Lost Village - Crunchyroll
Mobile Suit Gundam Unicorn RE:0096 - Crunchyroll
My Hero Academia - Funimation
Pan de Peace! - Crunchyroll
Re:Zero − Starting Life in Another World - Crunchyroll
Rin-ne Season 2 - Crunchyroll
Sailor Moon Crystal Season 3 - Crunchyroll, Hulu & Neon Alley
Shōnen Ashibe GO! GO! Goma-chan - Crunchyroll
Shōnen Maid - Funimation
Space Patrol Luluco - Crunchyroll
Super Lovers - Crunchyroll
Tanaka-kun is Always Listless - Crunchyroll
Terra Formars Revenge - Crunchyroll, Hulu & Neon Alley
Tonkatsu DJ Agetarō - Crunchyroll
Three Leaves, Three Colors - Funimation
Twin Star Exorcists - Crunchyroll
Ushio and Tora Season 2 - Crunchyroll

Summer 2016
91 Days - Crunchyroll
Active Raid Second - Crunchyroll
Alderamin on the Sky - Crunchyroll
Amanchu! - Crunchyroll
Ange Vierge - Crunchyroll
B-PROJECT - Crunchyroll
Bananya - Crunchyroll
Battery the Animation - Amazon Prime Video
Berserk - Crunchyroll
Cheer Boys!! - Funimation
Cute High Earth Defense Club LOVE! LOVE! - Crunchyroll
D.Gray-man Hallow - Funimation
Danganronpa 3: Side Despair - Funimation
Danganronpa 3: Side Future - Funimation
DAYS - Crunchyroll
The Disastrous Life of Saiki K. - Funimation
Fate/kaleid liner Prisma Illya 3rei! - Crunchyroll
First Love Monster - Funimation
Food Wars! The Second Plate - Crunchyroll
Handa-kun - Funimation
The Heroic Legend of Arslan: Dust Storm Dance - Funimation
The Highschool Life of a Fudanshi - Crunchyroll*Hitorinoshita - The Outcast - Crunchyroll
Hybrid x Heart Magias Academy Ataraxia - Crunchyroll
Love Live! Sunshine!! - Funimation
Mob Psycho 100 - Crunchyroll
Momokuri - Crunchyroll
The Morose Mononokean - Crunchyroll
Naria Girls - Crunchyroll
New Game! - Crunchyroll
Orange - Crunchyroll
OZMAFIA!! - Crunchyroll
Planetarian - Funimation
Puzzle & Dragons - Funimation
Qualidea Code - Crunchyroll
Regalia: The Three Sacred Stars - Funimation
ReLIFE - Crunchyroll
Rewrite - Crunchyroll
Scar-red Rider XechS - Funimation
Servamp - Funimation
Show By Rock!! Short!! - Funimation
Sweetness and Lightning - Crunchyroll
Taboo Tattoo - Crunchyroll
Tales of Zestiria the X - Funimation
This Art Club Has a Problem! - Crunchyroll
Time Travel Girl - Funimation
TSUKIUTA. The Animation - Funimation

Fall 2016 
All Out!! - Crunchyroll & Funimation
Anime De Training! XX - Crunchyroll
Aooni The Blue Monster - Crunchyroll
BBK/BRNK Season 2 - Crunchyroll
Bloodivores - Crunchyroll
Brave Witches - Crunchyroll
Bungo Stray Dogs Season 2 - Crunchyroll
Cheating Craft - Crunchyroll
Classicaloid - Crunchyroll & Hulu
Crane Game Girls Galaxy - Crunchyroll
Dragon Ball Super - Crunchyroll, Daisuki, Funimation (starting with episode 63)
Dream Festival! - Crunchyroll
Drifters - Crunchyroll & Funimation
Flip Flappers - Crunchyroll & Hulu
Gakuen Handsome - Crunchyroll
Girlish Number - Crunchyroll & Hulu
Haikyū!! Season 3 - Crunchyroll
Heybot!|HEYBOT! - Crunchyroll
Izetta: The Last Witch - Crunchyroll & Funimation
Joker Season 4 - Crunchyroll
Kaiju Girls - Crunchyroll
Keijo!!!!!!!! - Crunchyroll & Funimation
Kiss Him, Not Me - Crunchyroll & Funimation
Kiitarou Shounen no Youkai Enikki|Kiitaro's yokai picture diary - Crunchyroll
Long Riders! - Daisuki
Lostorage incited WIXOSS - Crunchyroll
Magical Girl Raising Project - Crunchyroll
Magic-kyun Renaissance - Crunchyroll
Magic of Stella - Daisuki
Mahou Shoujo Nante Mouiidesukara Season 2 - Crunchyroll
March comes in like a lion - Crunchyroll & Daisuki
Matoi the Sacred Slayer - Hulu
Miss Bernard said. - Crunchyroll
Mobile Suit Gundam: Iron-Blooded Orphans Season 2 - Crunchyroll, Daisuki & Hulu
Monster Hunter Stories: Ride On - Crunchyroll & Funimation
My Wife is the Student Council President+! - Crunchyroll
Nanbaka - Crunchyroll & Funimation
Natsume Yujin-cho Go - Crunchyroll
Nazotokine - Crunchyroll
Ninja Girl & Samurai Master - Crunchyroll
Occultic;Nine - Crunchyroll & Daisuki
Poco's Udon World - Crunchyroll
SENGOKUCHOJYUGIGA - Crunchyroll
Scorching Ping Pong Girls - Crunchyroll
Show by Rock!! # - Crunchyroll & Funimation
Soul Buster - Crunchyroll
Sound! Euphonium 2 - Crunchyroll
Teekyu Season 8 - Crunchyroll
Tiger Mask W - Crunchyroll
Time Bokan 24 - Crunchyroll
To Be Hero - Crunchyroll
Trickster - Crunchyroll & Funimation
Touken Ranbu: Hanamaru - Crunchyroll & Funimation
Nyanbo! - Crunchyroll
Utano☆Princesama Legend Star - Crunchyroll & Hulu
WWW.WAGNARIA!! - Crunchyroll & Daisuki
Yuri!!! on ICE - Crunchyroll & Funimation

Winter 2017 
ACCA: 13-Territory Inspection Dept. - Crunchyroll & Funimation
Ai Mai Mi: Surgical Friends - Crunchyroll
Akiba's Trip: The Animation - Crunchyroll & Funimation
BanG Dream! - Anime Network & Crunchyroll
Blue Exorcist: Kyoto Saga - Anime Strike, Crunchyroll & Daisuki
Chain Chronicle: The Light of Haecceitas - Crunchyroll & Funimation
Chaos;Child - Crunchyroll & Funimation
Chiruran 1/2 - Crunchyroll
Cyborg 009: Call of Justice (TV re-cut) - Netflix
ēlDLIVE - Crunchyroll
Fate/Grand Order: First Order - Crunchyroll & Daisuki
Forest Fairy Five - Crunchyroll
Fuuka - Crunchyroll & Funimation
Gabriel Dropout - Crunchyroll
Gintama Season 4 - Crunchyroll
Granblue Fantasy - Crunchyroll & Daisuki
Hand Shakers - Crunchyroll & Funimation
Idol Incidents - Crunchyroll
Interviews with Monster Girls - Crunchyroll & Funimation
Kemono Friends - Crunchyroll
KonoSuba: God's Blessing on This Wonderful World! 2 - Crunchyroll
Koro Sensei Quest - Crunchyroll & Funimation
Masamune-kun's Revenge - Crunchyroll & Funimation
Marginal♯4 - Crunchyroll
Minami Kamakura High School Girls Cycling Club - Crunchyroll
Miss Kobayashi's Dragon Maid - Crunchyroll & Funimation
Nyanko Days - Crunchyroll
One Room - Crunchyroll
Piacevole - Crunchyroll
Rewrite Season 2 - Crunchyroll
Schoolgirl Strikers - Crunchyroll
Scum's Wish - Anime Strike
Seiren - Crunchyroll
Descending Stories: Showa Genroku Rakugo Shinju Season 2 - Crunchyroll
Spiritpact - Crunchyroll
Super Lovers Season 2 - Crunchyroll
Saga of Tanya the Evil - Crunchyroll & Funimation
Tales of Zestiria the X Season 2 - Daisuki & Funimation
Urara Meirocho - Anime Network & Anime Strike
Yamishibai: Japanese Ghost Stories 4 - Crunchyroll
Yowamushi Pedal: New Generation - Crunchyroll

Spring 2017 
100% Pascal-sensei - Crunchyroll
Akashic Records of Bastard Magic Instructor - Crunchyroll & Funimation
Alice & Zouroku - Crunchyroll & Funimation
Anonymous Noise - Anime Strike
Armed Girl's Machiavellism - Anime Strike
Atom: The Beginning - Anime Strike
Attack on Titan Season 2 - Adult Swim, Crunchyroll, Funimation and Hulu
Berserk Season 2 - Crunchyroll
Bonobono Season 2 - Crunchyroll
Boruto: Naruto Next Generations - Crunchyroll & Hulu
Clockwork Planet - Crunchyroll & Funimation
The Eccentric Family Season 2 - Crunchyroll
Eromanga Sensei - Anime Strike, Crunchyroll & Daisuki
Frame Arms Girl - Anime Network
Future Card Buddyfight X - Crunchyroll & YouTube
Granblue Fantasy The Animation - Anime Strike, Crunchyroll, Daisuki & Hulu
Grimoire of Zero - Anime Strike
Hinako Note - Crunchyroll
Kabukibu! - Anime Strike
Kado: The Right Answer - Crunchyroll & Funimation
Kenka Bancho Otome: Girl Beats Boys - Crunchyroll & Funimation
The Laughing Salesman - Crunchyroll
Love Tyrant - Crunchyroll & Funimation
Monster Strike Season 2 - Crunchyroll
My Hero Academia Season 2 - Crunchyroll, Hulu & Funimation
Natsume's Book of Friends Season 6 - Crunchyroll
PriPri Chi-chan!! - Crunchyroll
Rage of Bahamut: Virgin Soul - Anime Strike
Re:Creators - Anime Strike
Rin-ne Season 3 - Anime Network
Room Mate - Crunchyroll
The Royal Tutor - Crunchyroll & Funimation
Sagrada Reset - Anime Strike
Sakura Quest - Crunchyroll & Funimation
Saekano: How to Raise a Boring Girlfriend Flat - Anime Strike
Seven Mortal Sins - Crunchyroll & Funimation
The Silver Guardian - Crunchyroll & Funimation
STARMYU Season 2 - Crunchyroll
Sword Oratoria: Is It Wrong to Try to Pick Up Girls in a Dungeon? On the Side - Anime Strike
Tsugumomo - Crunchyroll & Funimation
Tsuki ga Kirei - Crunchyroll & Funimation
Twin Angel Break - Crunchyroll
What do you do at the end of the world? Are you busy? Will you save us? - Crunchyroll & Funimation
Yu-Gi-Oh! VRAINS - Crunchyroll

Summer 2017 
As of this season, Hidive was established and Anime Network was shut down. Most shows previously available on Anime Network are now available on Hidive.

18if - Crunchyroll & Funimation
Action Heroine Cheer Fruits - Hidive
Aho Girl - Crunchyroll
Altair: A Record of Battles - Anime Strike
Angel's 3Piece! - Crunchyroll
Battle Girl High School - Hidive
A Centaur's Life - Crunchyroll & Funimation
Chronos Ruler - Crunchyroll & Funimation
Classroom of the Elite - Crunchyroll & Funimation
Clean Freak! Aoyama kun - Crunchyroll
Convenience Store Boy Friends - Crunchyroll & Funimation
Dive!! - Anime Strike
Elegant Yokai Apartment Life - Crunchyroll
Fastest Finger First - Crunchyroll
Gamers! - Crunchyroll & Funimation
Hell Girl Yoi no Togi - Anime Strike & Crunchyroll
Hina Logic - From Luck & Logic - Crunchyroll & Funimation
Hitorijime My Hero - Anime Strike
Ikemen Sengoku: Bromances Across Time - Crunchyroll
In Another World With My Smartphone - Crunchyroll & Funimation
The Irresponsible Galaxy Tylor - Crunchyroll
Katsugeki! Touken Ranbu - Anime Strike, Crunchyroll & Hulu
Knight's & Magic - Crunchyroll & Funimation
Lights of the Clione - Anime Strike
Love and Lies - Anime Strike
Made in Abyss - Anime Strike
Magical Circle Guru Guru - Crunchyroll
My First Girlfriend is a Gal - Crunchyroll & Funimation
New Game!! - Crunchyroll & Funimation
Nora, Princess, and Stray Cat - Crunchyroll
NTR: Netsuzou Trap - Crunchyroll
Princess Principal - Anime Strike
The Reflection - Crunchyroll & Funimation
Restaurant to Another World - Crunchyroll & Funimation
Saiyuki Reload Blast - Crunchyroll & Funimation
Teekyu 9 - Crunchyroll
Tsurezure Children - Crunchyroll & Funimation
Vatican Miracle Examiner - Anime Strike
Welcome to the Ballroom - Anime Strike
Yamishibai: Japanese Ghost Stories 5 - Crunchyroll

Fall 2017 
The Ancient Magus' Bride - Crunchyroll & Funimation
Animegataris - Crunchyroll & Funimation
Black Clover - Crunchyroll, Funimation and Hulu
Blend S - Crunchyroll
Blood Blockade Battlefront & Beyond - Crunchyroll & Funimation
Cardfight!! Vanguard G: Z - Crunchyroll
Classicaloid Season 2 - Hidive
Code: Realize − Guardian of Rebirth - Crunchyroll & Funimation
Dies irae - Crunchyroll & Funimation
Dynamic Chord - Hidive
Evil or Live - Crunchyroll
Food Wars! The Third Plate Part 1 - Crunchyroll
Garo: Vanishing Line - Crunchyroll & Funimation
Gintama Season 5 - Crunchyroll
Girls' Last Tour - Anime Strike
Himouto! Umaru-chan R - Anime Strike
Hozuki's Coolheadedness Season 2 - Hidive
The Idolm@ster Cinderella Girls Theater - Crunchyroll
The Idolm@ster Cinderella Girls Theater (web series) - Crunchyroll
Idolm@ster Side M - Crunchyroll
Infini-T Force - Tubi TV & Viz Media
Inuyashiki Last Hero - Anime Strike
Juni Taisen: Zodiac War - Crunchyroll & Funimation
Just Because! - Anime Strike
King's Game The Animation - Crunchyroll & Funimation
Kino's Journey -the Beautiful World- the Animated Series - Crunchyroll & Funimation
Konohana Kitan - Crunchyroll & Funimation
Land of the Lustrous - Anime Strike
Love Is Like a Cocktail - Crunchyroll
Love Live! Sunshine!! Season 2 - Crunchyroll & Funimation
Love Rice Season 2 - Crunchyroll
March comes in like a lion Season 2 - Crunchyroll
Monster Strike: The Fading Cosmos Season 2 - Crunchyroll
Mr. Osomatsu Season 2 - Crunchyroll
My Girlfriend is Shobitch - Anime Strike
Onyankopon (anime)|Onyankopon - Crunchyroll
Our love has always been 10 centimeters apart. - Crunchyroll
Rainy Cocoa Ame-con!! - Crunchyroll
Recovery of an MMO Junkie - Crunchyroll & Funimation
Sengoku Night Blood - Crunchyroll
A Sister's All You Need - Crunchyroll & Funimation
Taisho Mebiusline Chicchaisan - Crunchyroll
Time Bokan The Villains Strike Back - Crunchyroll
Tsukipro the Animation - Crunchyroll
Two Car - Crunchyroll
UQ Holder!: Magister Negi Magi! 2 - Anime Strike
URAHARA - Crunchyroll & Funimation
Wake Up, Girls! New Chapter - Crunchyroll
Yuki Yuna is a Hero: Hero Chapter - Anime Strike

Winter 2018 
As of this season, Amazon folded its Anime Strike channel into its Amazon Prime Video service. All shows previously noted as exclusive to Anime Strike are now exclusive to Amazon Prime Video except for those noted in Note C.

After the Rain - Amazon Prime Video
A.I.C.O. -Incarnation- - Netflix
B The Beginning - Netflix
Basilisk: The Ouka Ninja Scrolls - Crunchyroll, Funimation, and Hulu
Beatless - Amazon Prime Video
Cardcaptor Sakura: Clear Card - Crunchyroll, Funimation, and Hulu
Citrus - Crunchyroll & Funimation
Dagashi Kashi 2 - Crunchyroll & Funimation
Dame×Prince Anime Caravan - Hidive
DARLING in the FRANXX - Crunchyroll, Funimation, and Hulu
Death March to the Parallel World Rhapsody - Crunchyroll & Funimation
DEVILMAN crybaby - Netflix
gdgd men's party - Crunchyroll
Hakata Tonkotsu Ramens - Crunchyroll & Funimation
Hakumei and Mikochi - Hidive
Hitorinoshita - The Outcast 2 - Crunchyroll
Hoshin Engi - Crunchyroll & Funimation
How to Keep a Mummy - Crunchyroll
Idolish 7 - Crunchyroll
Junji Ito Collection - Crunchyroll & Funimation
Kaiju Girls Season 2 - Crunchyroll
Katana Maidens: Toji no Miko - Crunchyroll & Funimation
Killing Bites - Amazon Prime Video
Kokkoku: Moment by Moment - Amazon Prime Video
Laid-Back Camp - Crunchyroll
Märchen Mädchen - Crunchyroll
Mitchiri Neko - Crunchyroll
Mitsuboshi Colors - Hidive
Ms. Koizumi Loves Ramen Noodles - Crunchyroll
Overlord II - Crunchyroll, Funimation, and Hulu
A Place Further Than The Universe - Crunchyroll
Pop Team Epic - Hidive, Crunchyroll & Funimation
Record of Grancrest War - Crunchyroll & Hulu
The Ryuo's Work Is Never Done! - Crunchyroll
Sanrio Boys - Crunchyroll
School Babysitters - Crunchyroll
The Seven Heavenly Virtues - Hidive
The Silver Guardian 2 - Crunchyroll & Funimation
Slow Start - Crunchyroll
Sword Gai: The Animation - Netflix
Takunomi. - Hidive
Teasing Master Takagi-san - Crunchyroll & Funimation
Today's Menu for the Emiya Family - Crunchyroll
Touken Ranbu: Hanamaru Season 2 - Crunchyroll & Funimation
Working Buddies! - Crunchyroll
Yowamushi Pedal: Glory Line - Crunchyroll

Spring 2018 
Aggretsuko Season 1 - Netflix
Alice or Alice - Hidive
Amanchu! Advance - Crunchyroll
Butlers X Battlers - Crunchyroll
Caligula - Crunchyroll
Comic Girls - Crunchyroll
Crossing Time - Crunchyroll
Cute High Earth Defense Club HAPPY KISS! - Crunchyroll
Cutie Honey Universe - Hidive
Dances with the Dragons - Crunchyroll & Funimation
Devils' Line - Hidive
Doreiku - Hidive
Fist of the Blue Sky Regenesis - Crunchyroll
Food Wars! The Third Plate Part 2 - Crunchyroll
Full Metal Panic! Invisible Victory - Crunchyroll & Funimation
Future Card Buddyfight Ace - Crunchyroll & YouTube
GeGeGe no Kitarō Season 6 - Crunchyroll
Golden Kamuy - Crunchyroll & Funimation
Gundam Build Divers - Crunchyroll
Gurazeni: Money Pitch - Crunchyroll
High School DxD Hero - Crunchyroll, Funimation and Hulu
Hinamatsuri - Crunchyroll & Funimation
Hozuki's Coolheadedness Season 2, Part 2 - Hidive
Isekai Izakaya: Japanese Food From Another World - Crunchyroll
Kakuriyo: Bed and Breakfast for Spirits - Crunchyroll & Funimation
Last Period: the journey to the end of the despair - Crunchyroll
Legend of the Galactic Heroes: Die Neue These - Crunchyroll & Funimation
Libra of Nil Admirari - Crunchyroll
Lostorage conflated WIXOSS - Crunchyroll
Love To-LIE-Angle - Crunchyroll
Lupin the Third: Part 5 - Crunchyroll
Magical Girl Ore - Crunchyroll
Magical Girl Site - Amazon Prime Video
Major 2nd - Crunchyroll
Megalo Box - Crunchyroll
My Hero Academia Season 3 - Crunchyroll, Funimation and Hulu
My Sweet Tyrant - Crunchyroll
Ninja Girl & Samurai Master Season 3 - Crunchyroll
Persona 5: The Animation - Crunchyroll & Hulu
Real Girl - Hidive
Shōnen Ashibe GO! GO! Goma-chan Season 3 - Crunchyroll
Space Battleship Tiramisu - Crunchyroll & Funimation
Star Blazers: Space Battleship Yamato 2202 - Crunchyroll & Funimation
Steins;Gate 0 - Crunchyroll & Funimation
Sword Art Online Alternative Gun Gale Online - Crunchyroll & Hulu
SWORDGAI: The Animation Part I - Netflix
Tada Never Falls in Love - Hidive
Tokyo Ghoul:re - Funimation and Hulu
Uma Musume Pretty Derby - Crunchyroll
Wotakoi: Love is Hard for Otaku - Amazon Prime Video
Yotsuiro Biyori - Crunchyroll
You Don't Know Gunma Yet - Crunchyroll

Summer 2018 
100 Sleeping Princes and the Kingdom of Dreams: The Animation - Hidive
Angels of Death - Crunchyroll, Funimation  and Hulu
Angolmois: Record of Mongol Invasion - Crunchyroll
Asobi Asobase - Crunchyroll
Attack on Titan Season 3, Part 1 - Crunchyroll, Adult Swim, Funimation and Hulu
Banana Fish - Amazon Prime Video
Calamity of the Zombie Girl - Crunchyroll
Cells at Work! - Crunchyroll
Chio's School Road - Crunchyroll, Funimation and Hulu
Dropkick on My Devil! - Amazon Prime Video
Encouragement of Climb Season 3 - Crunchyroll
Free! -Dive to Future- - Crunchyroll & Funimation
Grand Blue Dreaming - Amazon Prime Video
Hanebado! - Crunchyroll & Funimation
Happy Sugar Life - Amazon Prime Video
Harukana Receive - Crunchyroll & Funimation
Holmes of Kyoto - Crunchyroll
How Not to Summon a Demon Lord - Crunchyroll, Funimation and Hulu
The Idolm@ster Cinderella Girls Theater Season 3 - Crunchyroll
The Idolm@ster Cinderella Girls Theater Season 3 (web series) - Crunchyroll
Island - Crunchyroll & Funimation
The Journey Home - Crunchyroll
Late Night! The Genius Bakabon - Crunchyroll
Lord of Vermilion: The Crimson King - Crunchyroll & Funimation
The Master of Ragnarok & Blesser of Einherjar - Crunchyroll & Funimation
Meow Meow Japanese History - Crunchyroll
Monster Strike Season 3 - Crunchyroll
Mr. Tonegawa: Middle Management Blues - Crunchyroll & Hidive
Muhyo & Roji's Bureau of Supernatural Investigation - Crunchyroll
Music Girls - AsianCrush & Crunchyroll
One Room Season 2 - Crunchyroll
Overlord III - Crunchyroll & Funimation and Hulu
Phantom in the Twilight - Crunchyroll
Planet With - Crunchyroll
Revue Starlight - Hidive
Seven Senses of the Reunion - Amazon Prime Video
Starlight Promises - Crunchyroll
SWORDGAI: The Animation Part II - Netflix
The Thousand Musketeers - Hidive
We Rent Tsukumogami - Crunchyroll
Working Buddies! Season 2 - Crunchyroll
Yamishibai: Japanese Ghost Stories 6 - Crunchyroll
Yuuna and the Haunted Hot Springs - Crunchyroll

Fall 2018 
Ace Attorney Season 2 - Crunchyroll & Funimation
Anima Yell! - Crunchyroll
As Miss Beelzebub Likes - Crunchyroll
Bakumatsu - Crunchyroll
Between the Sky and Sea - Crunchyroll
Black Clover Season 2 - Crunchyroll, Funimation and Hulu
Bloom Into You - Hidive
Boarding School Juliet - Amazon Prime Video
A Certain Magical Index III - Crunchyroll & Funimation
Conception - Crunchyroll & Funimation
DAKAICHI -I'm being harassed by the sexiest man of the year- - Crunchyroll
Double Decker! Doug & Kirill - Crunchyroll & Funimation
Fairy Tail Final Season - Crunchyroll & Funimation
Fist of the Blue Sky Regenesis Part 2 - Crunchyroll
Gakuen Basara: Samurai High School - Hidive
The Girl in Twilight - Hidive
Goblin Slayer - Crunchyroll & Funimation
Golden Kamuy Season 2 - Crunchyroll & Funimation
Gurazeni: Money Pitch Season 2 - Crunchyroll
Hero Mask - Netflix
HIMOTE HOUSE: A share house of super psychic girls - Crunchyroll
Hinomaru Sumo - Crunchyroll & Funimation
The IDOLM@STER SideM Wakeatte Mini! - Crunchyroll
Iroduku: The World in Colors - Amazon Prime Video
Jingai-san no Yome - Crunchyroll
JoJo's Bizarre Adventure: Golden Wind - Crunchyroll
Karakuri Circus - Amazon Prime Video
Merc StoriA: The Apathetic Boy and the Girl in a Bottle - Crunchyroll
Ms. Vampire Who Lives in My Neighborhood - Crunchyroll
My Sister, My Writer - Crunchyroll
Radiant - Crunchyroll & Funimation
Rascal Does Not Dream of Bunny Girl Senpai - Crunchyroll, Funimation & Hulu
Release the Spyce - Hidive
RErideD: Derrida, who leaps through time - Crunchyroll & Funimation
Run with the Wind - Crunchyroll
Saint Seiya: Saintia Shō - Crunchyroll
Senran Kagura Shinovi Master - Crunchyroll & Funimation
Skull-face Bookseller Honda-san - Crunchyroll
Space Battleship Tiramisu Season 2 - Crunchyroll & Funimation
SSSS.Gridman - Crunchyroll & Funimation
Sword Art Online: Alicization - Crunchyroll, Funimation & Hulu
That Time I Got Reincarnated as a Slime - Crunchyroll & Funimation
Tokyo Ghoul:re Part 2 - Funimation and Hulu
Tsurune - Crunchyroll & Hidive
Ulysses: Jeanne d'Arc and the Alchemist Knight - Crunchyroll & Funimation
Uzamaid! - Crunchyroll
Voice of Fox - Crunchyroll
Xuan Yuan Sword Luminary - Crunchyroll
Zombie Land Saga - Crunchyroll & Funimation

Winter 2019 
B-PROJECT: Zecchō Emotion - Crunchyroll
BanG Dream! Season 2 - Hidive & Crunchyroll
Bermuda Triangle: Colorful Pastrale - Hidive
Boogiepop and Others - Crunchyroll & Funimation
Date A Live III - Crunchyroll & Funimation
Dimension High School - Hidive & Crunchyroll
Domestic Girlfriend - Hidive & Crunchyroll
Dororo - Amazon Prime Video
Endro~! - Crunchyroll & Funimation
Girly Air Force - Crunchyroll
Grimms Notes: The Animation - Crunchyroll
How Clumsy you are, Miss Ueno - Hidive & Crunchyroll
Kaguya-sama: Love is War - Crunchyroll, Funimation & Hulu
Katana Maidens ~ Mini Toji - Crunchyroll
Kemono Friends 2 - Crunchyroll
Kemurikusa - Amazon Prime Video
Magical Girl Spec-Ops Asuka - Crunchyroll & Funimation
The Magnificent Kotobuki - Hidive & Crunchyroll
Meiji Tokyo Renka - Crunchyroll
Mob Psycho 100 II - Crunchyroll & Funimation
The Morose Mononokean II - Crunchyroll & Funimation
Mysteria Friends - Crunchyroll
Pastel Memories - Hidive & Crunchyroll
The Price of Smiles - Crunchyroll
The Promised Neverland - Crunchyroll, Funimation, Hulu & Hidive
The Quintessential Quintuplets - Crunchyroll & Funimation
Rainy SideG - Crunchyroll
Real Girl Season 2 - Hidive
Rinshii!! Ekodachan - Crunchyroll & Funimation
The Rising of the Shield Hero - Crunchyroll
My Roommate Is a Cat - Crunchyroll & Funimation
Star Blazers: Space Battleship Yamato 2202 - Funimation
Virtual-san Looking - Crunchyroll
W'z - Hidive & Crunchyroll
Wataten!: An Angel Flew Down to Me - Crunchyroll

Spring 2019 
7 Seeds - Netflix
Ace of Diamond Act II - Crunchyroll
Afterlost - Funimation & Hulu
Aggretsuko Season 2 - Netflix
AMAZING STRANGER - Crunchyroll
Ao-chan Can't Study! - Hidive & Crunchyroll
Attack on Titan Season 3, Part 2 - Crunchyroll, Funimation & Hulu
Bakumatsu Crisis - Crunchyroll
Bungo Stray Dogs Season 3 - Crunchyroll & Funimation
Cinderella Nine - Crunchyroll
Demon Slayer: Kimetsu no Yaiba - Crunchyroll, Funimation & Hulu
Fairy gone - Funimation & Hulu
Fruits Basket - Crunchyroll & Funimation
The Helpful Fox Senko-san - Crunchyroll & Funimation
Hitori Bocchi no Marumaru Seikatsu - Crunchyroll
The Idolm@ster Cinderella Girls Theater Climax Season - Crunchyroll
The Idolm@ster Cinderella Girls Theater 3rd Season and Climax Season (web series) - Crunchyroll
Isekai Quartet - Crunchyroll & Funimation
Joshi Kausei - Crunchyroll
King of Prism: Shiny Seven Stars - Crunchyroll
Kono Oto Tomare! Sounds of Life - Funimation & Hulu
Midnight Occult Civil Servants - Crunchyroll & Funimation
Miru Tights - YouTube
Million Arthur (TV series) Season 2 - Crunchyroll & Funimation
MIX - Crunchyroll, Funimation & Hulu
Mobile Suit Gundam the Origin: Advent of the Red Comet - Crunchyroll
Namu Amida Bu! -Rendai Utena- - Hidive & Crunchyroll
Nobunaga Teacher's Young Bride - Crunchyroll
One-Punch Man Season 2 - Hulu
RobiHachi - Funimation & Hulu
Sarazanmai - Crunchyroll & Funimation
Senryu Girl - Hidive & Crunchyroll
Shōnen Ashibe GO! GO! Goma-chan Season 4 - Crunchyroll
Strike Witches: 501st Joint Fighter Wing Take Off! - Crunchyroll & Funimation
Wacky TV Na na na Season 2 - Crunchyroll
We Never Learn: BOKUBEN - Crunchyroll, Funimation & Hulu
Why the Hell are You Here, Teacher!? - Hidive & Crunchyroll
Wise Man's Grandchild - Crunchyroll, Funimation & Hulu 
Yatogame-chan Kansatsu Nikki - Crunchyroll
YU-NO: A Girl Who Chants Love at the Bound of this World - Crunchyroll & Funimation

Summer 2019 
Are You Lost? - Crunchyroll
Arifureta: From Commonplace to World's Strongest - Funimation & Hulu
Astra Lost in Space - Funimation & Hulu
BEM - Funimation & Hulu
A Certain Scientific Accelerator - Crunchyroll & Funimation
Cop Craft - Funimation & Hulu
The Demon Girl Next Door - Hidive 
Demon Lord, Retry! - Funimation & Hulu
Do You Love Your Mom and Her Two-Hit Multi-Target Attacks? - Crunchyroll & Funimation
Dr. Stone - Crunchyroll & Funimation
Ensemble Stars! - Funimation
Fire Force - Crunchyroll & Funimation
Given - Crunchyroll
Granbelm - Crunchyroll
Hakata Mentai! Pirikarako-chan - Crunchyroll
Hensuki: Are you willing to fall in love with a pervert, as long as she’s a cutie? - Funimation
How heavy are the dumbbells you lift? - Funimation
If It's for My Daughter, I'd Even Defeat a Demon Lord - Crunchyroll
Is It Wrong to Try to Pick Up Girls in a Dungeon? II - Hidive & Crunchyroll
Isekai Cheat Magician - Crunchyroll
Kengan Ashura - Netflix
Kochoki - Funimation & Hulu
Lord El-Melloi II's Case Files: {Rail Zeppelin} Grace note - Crunchyroll & Funimation
Magical Sempai - Crunchyroll
O Maidens in Your Savage Season - Hidive
The Ones Within - Funimation & Hulu
Re:Stage! Dream Days♪ - Hidive 
SD Gundam World Sangoku Soketsuden (web series) - Crunchyroll
STARMYU Season 3 - Crunchyroll
Symphogear XV - Crunchyroll
To the Abandoned Sacred Beasts - Crunchyroll
Try Knights - Crunchyroll
Vinland Saga - Amazon Prime Video
Wasteful Days of High School Girls - Hidive
Yamishibai: Japanese Ghost Stories 7 - Crunchyroll

Fall 2019 
Actors: Song Connection - Funimation
African Office Worker - Funimation
After School Dice Club - Funimation & Hulu
Ahiru no Sora - Hidive & Crunchyroll
Ascendance of a Bookworm - Crunchyroll
Assassin's Pride - Hidive & Crunchyroll
Azur Lane - Funimation & Hulu
Babylon - Amazon Prime Video
Bananya Season 2 - Crunchyroll
Black Clover Season 3 - Crunchyroll, Funimation and Hulu
Blade of the Immortal -Immortal- - Amazon Prime Video
Case File nº221: Kabukicho - Funimation & Hulu
Cautious Hero: The Hero Is Overpowered but Overly Cautious - Funimation & Hulu
Chidori RSC (Rifle is Beautiful) - Hidive
Chihayafuru Season 3 - Crunchyroll
Days of Urashimasakatasen - Crunchyroll
Didn't I Say to Make My Abilities Average in the Next Life?! - Crunchyroll
Fairy gone Part 2 - Funimation & Hulu
Fate/Grand Order - Absolute Demonic Front: Babylonia - Funimation
Food Wars! The Fourth Plate - Crunchyroll
Granblue Fantasy The Animation Season 2 - Crunchyroll, Funimation & Hidive
Gundam Build Divers Re:Rise - Crunchyroll
High School Prodigies Have It Easy Even In Another World - Crunchyroll
Kandagawa Jet Girls - Hidive
Kemono Michi: Rise Up - Funimation & Hulu
Kono Oto Tomare! Sounds of Life Part 2 - Funimation & Hulu
Monster Strike: End of the World - YouTube
My Hero Academia Season 4 - Crunchyroll, Funimation and Hulu
No Guns Life - Funimation & Hulu
Null & Peta - Crunchyroll
OBSOLETE - YouTube Premium
ORESUKI Are you the only one who loves me? - Crunchyroll, Funimation & Hidive
Outburst Dreamer Boys - Hidive
Phantasy Star Online 2: Episode Oracle - Funimation & Hulu
Psycho-Pass 3 - Amazon Prime Video
Radiant Season 2 - Crunchyroll & Funimation
Special 7: Special Crime Investigation Unit - Funimation & Hulu
Stand My Heroes: Piece of Truth - Funimation & Hulu
Stars Align - Funimation & Hulu
Sword Art Online Alicization: War of the Underworld - Crunchyroll, Funimation, Hidive & Hulu
True Cooking Master Boy - Crunchyroll
Val x Love - Hidive
We Never Learn: BOKUBEN Season 2 - Crunchyroll, Funimation, Hidive & Hulu
Welcome to Demon School! Iruma-kun - Crunchyroll
Z/X Code Reunion - Hidive

Winter 2020 
22/7 - Funimation
7 Seeds Season 2 - Netflix
A Destructive God Sits Next to Me - Crunchyroll
A3! - Funimation & Hulu
ARP Backstage Pass - Crunchyroll
Asteroid in Love - Crunchyroll & Funimation
BanG Dream! Season 3 - Hidive 
BOFURI: I Don't Want to Get Hurt, so I'll Max Out My Defense. - Funimation & Hulu
The Case Files of Jeweler Richard - Crunchyroll
A Certain Scientific Railgun T - Crunchyroll & Funimation
Darwin's Game - Funimation
The Daily Life of the Immortal King Season 1 – bilibili
Haikyu!!: To the Top - Crunchyroll
Hatena Illusion - Funimation
ID - Invaded - Funimation & Hulu
If My Favorite Pop Idol Made It to the Budokan, I Would Die - Funimation
In/Spectre - Crunchyroll
Infinite Dendrogram - Funimation & Hulu
Interspecies Reviewers - Funimation 
Isekai Quartet 2 - Crunchyroll & Funimation
The Island of Giant Insects - Crunchyroll
Keep Your Hands Off Eizouken! - Crunchyroll
Magia Record: Puella Magi Madoka Magica Side Story - Funimation
Nekopara - Funimation
number24 - Funimation
OBSOLETE - Part II - YouTube Premium
Oda Cinnamon Nobunaga - Crunchyroll
Pet - Amazon Prime Video
Plunderer - Funimation & Hulu
Re:Zero − Starting Life in Another World Director's Cut - Crunchyroll
ROOM CAMP - Crunchyroll
Science Fell in Love, So I Tried to Prove It - Crunchyroll
Seton Academy: Join the Pack! - Crunchyroll
Show By Rock!! Mashumairesh!! - Funimation
Smile Down the Runway - Funimation & Hulu
Somali and the Forest Spirit - Crunchyroll
Sorcerous Stabber Orphen - Funimation & Hulu
Toilet-Bound Hanako-kun - Funimation & Hulu
Uchitama?! Have you seen my Tama? - Funimation
Yatogame-chan Kansatsu Nikki 2 - Crunchyroll

Spring 2020 
Due to COVID-19 concerns several series were postponed or had episodes delayed once they started streaming. Also, the great majority of simuldubs for this season were postponed.

The 8th Son? Are You Kidding Me? - Crunchyroll
Appare-Ranman! - Funimation & Hulu (delayed after episode 3)
Arte - Funimation
Ascendance of a Bookworm Part 2 - Crunchyroll
Bungo & Alchemist - Funimation
Diary of Our Days at the Breakwater - Funimation (delayed after episode 3)
Digimon Adventure: - Crunchyroll
Dropkick on My Devil! Dash - Crunchyroll
Food Wars! The Fifth Plate - Crunchyroll (delayed after episode 2)
Fruits Basket Season 2 - Crunchyroll & Funimation (same-day simuldub was delayed after episode 3)
Future's Folktales - Hidive
Gal & Dino - Funimation (delayed after episode 7)
Gleipnir - Funimation & Hulu
Gundam Build Divers Re:Rise 2nd Season - Crunchyroll & YouTube (delayed after episode 18)
The House Spirit Tatami-chan (ONA) - Crunchyroll
IDOLiSH7 Second Beat! - Crunchyroll (delayed after episode 4)
Kaguya-sama: Love is War Season 2 - Funimation
Kakushigoto: My Dad's Secret Ambition - Funimation
Kemono Friends: Welcome to the Japari Park Season 2 - Crunchyroll
Kingdom 3 - Funimation (delayed after episode 4)
Listeners - Funimation (only the first same-day simuldub episode was streamed on time) & Hulu
Major 2nd Season 2 - Crunchyroll (delayed after episode 4)
MASHIN HERO WATARU THE SEVEN SPIRITS OF RYUJINMARU - YouTube (delayed after episode 2)
The Millionaire Detective Balance: Unlimited - Funimation (postponed after episode 2)
My Next Life as a Villainess: All Routes Lead to Doom! - Crunchyroll
Olympia Kyklos - Crunchyroll (delayed after episode 4)
Princess Connect! Re:Dive - Crunchyroll
Sakura Wars the Animation - Funimation
Shachibato! President, It's Time for Battle! - Funimation
Shadowverse - Crunchyroll
Shironeko Project: Zero Chronicle - Funimation & Hulu
Sing "Yesterday" for Me - Crunchyroll
Tamayomi - Funimation
Tower of God - Crunchyroll
Tsugumomo2 - Crunchyroll & Funimation
Wacky TV Na na na Season 3 - Crunchyroll
Wave, Listen to Me! - Funimation
Woodpecker Detective's Office - Crunchyroll

Summer 2020 
Aggretsuko Season 3 - Netflix
Cardfight!! Vanguard Gaiden if - Crunchyroll (starting with episode 13)
Deca-Dence - Funimation & Hulu
Fire Force Season 2 - Crunchyroll & Funimation
Gibiate - Crunchyroll
The God of High School - Crunchyroll
Healin' Good PreCure - Crunchyroll (starting with episode 13)
Lapis Re:Lights - Funimation
The Misfit of Demon King Academy - Crunchyroll
Monster Girl Doctor - Crunchyroll
Mr Love: Queen's Choice - Crunchyroll
Muhyo & Roji's Bureau of Supernatural Investigation Season 2 - Funimation
My Teen Romantic Comedy SNAFU Climax - Crunchyroll & Hidive
Ninja Collection - Crunchyroll
No Guns Life Part 2 - Funimation & Hulu
Peter Grill and the Philosopher's Time - Crunchyroll & Hidive
Re:Zero − Starting Life in Another World Season 2, Part 1 - Crunchyroll
Rent-A-Girlfriend - Crunchyroll
Super HxEros - Funimation
Sword Art Online Alicization: War of the Underworld Part 2 - Crunchyroll, Funimation, Hidive & Hulu
Umayon - Crunchyroll
Uzaki-chan Wants to Hang Out! - Funimation

Fall 2020 
A3! Season Autumn & Winter - Funimation & Hulu
Adachi and Shimamura - Funimation
Akudama Drive - Funimation & Hulu
Animation Kapibara-san - Crunchyroll
Assault Lily BOUQUET - Funimation
Attack on Titan Final Season, Part 1 - Crunchyroll, Funimation, Adult Swim & Hulu
Black Clover Season 4 - Crunchyroll, Funimation and Hulu
By the Grace of the Gods - Funimation & Hulu
D4DJ First Mix - Crunchyroll, Funimation, Hidive & YouTube
The Day I Became a God - Funimation & Hulu
<DOGEZA>I Tried Asking While Kowtowing. - Crunchyroll
Don't Call Us A JUNK GAME! - Crunchyroll
Dragon Quest: The Adventure of Dai - Crunchyroll & Hulu
Dropout Idol Fruit Tart - Funimation
Eagle Talon: Golden Spell - Crunchyroll
Genie Family 2020 - Crunchyroll
Golden Kamuy Season 3 - Crunchyroll & Funimation
Grand Blues! - Crunchyroll
The Gymnastics Samurai - Funimation
Haikyu!!: To the Top Part 2 - Crunchyroll
Higurashi: When They Cry - Gou - Funimation & Hulu
Hypnosis Mic: Division Rap Battle: Rhyme Anima - Funimation
I'm Standing on a Million Lives - Crunchyroll
Ikebukuro West Gate Park - Funimation
The Irregular at Magic High School Season 2 - Funimation & Hulu
Is It Wrong to Try to Pick Up Girls in a Dungeon? III - Crunchyroll & Hidive
Is the Order a Rabbit? BLOOM - Crunchyroll & Hidive
Iwa-Kakeru! Climbing Girls - Crunchyroll
Jujutsu Kaisen - Crunchyroll
King's Raid: Successors of the Will - Funimation
Kuma Kuma Kuma Bear - Funimation & Hulu
Love Live! Nijigasaki High School Idol Club - Funimation
Maesetsu!: Opening Act  - Funimation
Magatsu Wahrheit - Funimation
Moriarty the Patriot - Funimation
Mr. Osomatsu Season 3 - Crunchyroll
Noblesse - Crunchyroll
Oh, Suddenly Egyptian God - Crunchyroll
One Room Season 3 - Crunchyroll
Our Last Crusade or the Rise of a New World - Funimation & Hulu
Rail Romanesque - Crunchyroll & Funimation
Sleepy Princess in the Demon Castle - Funimation
Strike Witches: Road to Berlin - Crunchyroll
Talentless Nana - Funimation 
TALES OF CRESTROIA -THE WAKE OF SIN- - Crunchyroll & YouTube
That is the Bottleneck - Crunchyroll & Funimation
TONIKAWA: Over the Moon for You - Crunchyroll
Tsukiuta. THE ANIMATION Season 2 - Crunchyroll & Funimation
Wandering Witch: The Journey of Elaina - Funimation & Hulu
Warlords of Sigrdrifa - Funimation
With a Dog AND a Cat, Every Day is Fun - Crunchyroll
Yashahime: Princess Half-Demon - Crunchyroll, Funimation & Hulu

Winter 2021 
2.43: Seiin High School Boys Volleyball Team - Funimation
ABCiee Working Diary - Crunchyroll
Armor Shop for Ladies & Gentlemen Season 2 - Crunchyroll
Azur Lane: Slow Ahead! - Crunchyroll
B: The Beginning Succession - Netflix
Back Arrow - Funimation
Bottom-tier Character Tomozaki - Funimation
Bungo Stray Dogs Wan! - Crunchyroll
Cells at Work! Season 2 - Funimation
Cells at Work! Code Black - Funimation
Cute Executive Officer - Hidive
Dr. Ramune Mysterious Disease Specialist - Crunchyroll
Dr. Stone: Stone Wars - Crunchyroll & Funimation
Ex-Arm - Crunchyroll
Gekidol - Funimation
Heaven's Design Team - Crunchyroll
The Hidden Dungeon Only I Can Enter - Crunchyroll
High-Rise Invasion - Netflix
Horimiya - Funimation & Hulu
Hortensia Saga - Funimation
I-Chu Halfway Through the Idol - Crunchyroll
Idolls! - Crunchyroll
Idoly Pride - Funimation
Kemono Jihen - Funimation
Kiyo in Kyoto: From the Maiko House - Crunchyroll & NHK World-Japan
Laid-Back Camp Season 2 - Crunchyroll
LBX Girls - Funimation
Log Horizon: Destruction of the Round Table - Funimation
Mushoku Tensei: Jobless Reincarnation - Funimation & Hulu
Non Non Biyori Nonstop - Hidive & Crunchyroll
Otherside Picnic - Funimation
Project Scard: Scar on the Praeter - Funimation
The Promised Neverland Season 2 - Funimation & Hulu
The Quintessential Quintuplets Season 2 - Crunchyroll & Funimation
Re:Zero − Starting Life in Another World Season 2, Part 2 - Crunchyroll
Redo of Healer - Hidive
Show by Rock!! Stars!! - Funimation
SK8 the Infinity - Funimation
Skate-Leading Stars - Funimation
So I'm a Spider, So What? - Crunchyroll
Sorcerous Stabber Orphen: Battle of Kimluck - Funimation
Suppose a Kid From the Last Dungeon Boonies Moved to a Starter Town - Funimation
That Time I Got Reincarnated as a Slime Season 2 - Crunchyroll & Funimation
Tropical-Rouge! Pretty Cure - Crunchyroll
True Cooking Master Boy Season 2 - Crunchyroll
Uma Musume Pretty Derby Season 2 - Crunchyroll
Vlad Love - Crunchyroll
Wave!! -Lets go Surfing- - Crunchyroll
WIXOSS Diva Live - Crunchyroll
Wonder Egg Priority - Funimation
World Trigger Season 2 - Crunchyroll
World Witches Take Off! - Crunchyroll
Yamishibai: Japanese Ghost Stories Season 8 - Crunchyroll
Yatogame-chan Kansatsu Nikki Season 3 - Crunchyroll

Spring 2021
86 - Crunchyroll
Bakuten!! - Crunchyroll
Battle Athletes Victory ReSTART! - Funimation
Blue Reflection Ray - Funimation
Burning Kabaddi - Crunchyroll
Cardfight!! Vanguard overDress - Crunchyroll, Funimation, Hidive & YouTube
Cestvs: The Roman Fighter - Crunchyroll
Combatants Will Be Dispatched! - Funimation
Don't Toy With Me, Miss Nagatoro - Crunchyroll
Dragon Goes House-Hunting - Funimation
Edens Zero - Netflix
Fairy Ranmaru - Crunchyroll
Farewell, My Dear Cramer - Crunchyroll
Fruits Basket: The Final - Crunchyroll & Funimation
Full Dive: This Ultimate Next-Gen Full Dive RPG Is Even Shittier than Real Life! - Funimation
Gloomy The Naughty Grizzly - Crunchyroll
Hetalia: World Stars - Funimation
Higehiro: After Being Rejected, I Shaved and Took In a High School Runaway - Crunchyroll
How NOT to Summon a Demon Lord Ω - Crunchyroll & Funimation
I've Been Killing Slimes for 300 Years and Maxed Out My Level - Crunchyroll
Joran: The Princess of Snow and Blood - Crunchyroll
Koikimo - Crunchyroll
Let's Make a Mug Too - Crunchyroll
Link Click - Funimation
Mars Red - Funimation
Megalo Box 2: Nomad - Funimation & Hulu
Miss Kobayashi's Dragon Maid S Short Animation Series (web series) - Crunchyroll
Moriarty the Patriot Part 2 - Funimation
My Hero Academia Season 5 - Crunchyroll, Funimation & Hulu
Odd Taxi - Crunchyroll
Osamake: Romcom Where The Childhood Friend Won't Lose - Crunchyroll
Pretty Boy Detective Club - Funimation
Record of Ragnarok - Netflix
The Saint's Magic Power Is Omnipotent - Funimation
SD Gundam World Heroes - Crunchyroll, Funimation & YouTube
Seven Knights Revolution: Hero Successor - Crunchyroll
Shadows House - Funimation
SSSS.Dynazenon - Funimation
Super Cub - Funimation
The Slime Diaries: That Time I Got Reincarnated as a Slime - Crunchyroll
Those Snow White Notes - Crunchyroll
To Your Eternity - Crunchyroll
Tokyo Revengers - Crunchyroll
Vivy: Fluorite Eye's Song - Funimation
The Way of the Househusband - Netflix
Welcome to Demon School! Iruma-kun Season 2 - Crunchyroll
The World Ends with You: The Animation - Funimation & Hulu
Zombie Land Saga Revenge - Crunchyroll & Funimation

Summer 2021
Aquatope of White Sand - Crunchyroll
Battle Game in 5 Seconds - Crunchyroll
The Case Study of Vanitas - Funimation & Hulu
D Cide Traumerei - Crunchyroll
The Detective Is Already Dead - Funimation
Drugstore in Another World: The Slow Life of a Cheat Pharmacist - Crunchyroll
The Duke of Death and His Maid - Funimation
The Dungeon of Black Company - Funimation
Fena: Pirate Princess - Crunchyroll & Adult Swim
Fire in His Fingertips Season 2 - Coolmic
Getter Robo Arc - Hidive
Girlfriend, Girlfriend - Crunchyroll
The Great Jahy Will Not Be Defeated! - Crunchyroll
Higurashi When They Cry Sotsu - Funimation & Hulu
The Honor Student at Magic High School - Funimation & Hulu
How a Realist Hero Rebuilt the Kingdom - Funimation & Hulu
I, Tsushima - YouTube
I'm Standing on a Million Lives Season 2 - Crunchyroll
The Idaten Deities Know Only Peace - Crunchyroll
IDOLiSH7 Third Beat! Part 1 - Crunchyroll
Kageki Shojo!! - Funimation
Life Lessons with Uramichi Oniisan - Funimation
Love Live! Superstar!! - Funimation
Magia Record: Puella Magi Madoka Magica Side Story Season 2 - Crunchyroll, Funimation & Hidive
mini vanguard Large - YouTube
Miss Kobayashi's Dragon Maid S - Crunchyroll & Funimation
Mother of the Goddess' Dormitory - Hidive
My Next Life as a Villainess: All Routes Lead to Doom! X - Crunchyroll
Night Head 2041 - Crunchyroll
Obey Me! - Funimation
Peach Boy Riverside - Crunchyroll
Re-Main - Funimation
Remake Our Life! - Crunchyroll
Scarlet Nexus - Funimation
Seirei Gensouki: Spirit Chronicles - Crunchyroll
Sonny Boy - Funimation & Hulu
That Time I Got Reincarnated as a Slime Season 2, Part 2 - Crunchyroll & Funimation
Theatre of Darkness 9th (Yamishibai: Japanese Ghost Stories 9) - Crunchyroll
Tsukimichi: Moonlit Fantasy - Crunchyroll
Tsukipro the Animation 2 - Hidive (delayed to restart on October after episode 8 due to COVID-19)

Fall 2021
86 Part 2 - Crunchyroll
Aggretsuko Season 4 - Netflix
AMAIM Warrior at the Borderline - Funimation
Ancient Girl's Frame - Funimation
BanG Dream! Girls Band Party! ☆ Pico Fever! - YouTube
Banished from the Hero’s Party, I Decided to Live a Quiet Life in the Countryside - Funimation
Blue Period - Netflix
Build Divide -#00000 (Code Black)- - Crunchyroll & Funimation
Cardfight!! Vanguard overDress Season 2 - Crunchyroll, Funimation, Hidive & YouTube
The Daily Life of the Immortal King Season 2 - bilibili & Funimation
Deep Insanity: The Lost Child - Funimation
Demon Slayer: Kimetsu no Yaiba Entertainment District Arc - Crunchyroll, Funimation & Hulu
Demon Slayer: Kimetsu no Yaiba Mugen Train Arc - Crunchyroll, Funimation & Hulu
Digimon Ghost Game - Crunchyroll
Everything for Demon King Evelogia - Coolmic
The Faraway Paladin - Crunchyroll
The Fruit of Evolution - Crunchyroll
Ganbare Dōki-chan - Crunchyroll
Gundam Breaker Battlogue - YouTube
The Heike Story - Funimation
Irina: The Vampire Cosmonaut - Funimation
JoJo's Bizarre Adventure: Stone Ocean - Netflix
Kaginado - Crunchyroll, Funimation & Hidive
Komi Can't Communicate - Netflix
Let's Make a Mug Too Season 2 - Crunchyroll
Lupin the 3rd Part 6 - Hidive
Mieruko-chan - Funimation
Mushoku Tensei: Jobless Reincarnation Part 2 - Funimation & Hulu
Muteking the Dancing Hero - Funimation
Muv-Luv Alternative - Crunchyroll
My Senpai Is Annoying - Funimation
The Night Beyond the Tricornered Window - Crunchyroll
Platinum End - Crunchyroll, Funimation & Hulu
Pokémon Evolutions - YouTube
Pop Team Epic Repeat - Crunchyroll, Funimation & Hidive
PuraOre! Pride of Orange - Funimation
Ranking of Kings - Crunchyroll & Funimation
Restaurant to Another World Season 2 - Crunchyroll & Funimation
Rumble Garanndoll - Funimation
Sakugan - Crunchyroll
Selection Project  - Funimation
Shikizakura - Hidive
ShowTime! - Coolmic
Taisho Otome Fairy Tale - Funimation
Takt Op - Crunchyroll
Tawawa on Monday Season 2 - Crunchyroll
Tesla Note - Funimation
The Vampire Dies in No Time - Funimation
Visual Prison - Funimation
Waccha PriMagi! - Hidive
World Trigger Season 3 - Crunchyroll
The World's Finest Assassin Gets Reincarnated in Another World as an Aristocrat - Crunchyroll
Yashahime: Princess Half-Demon: The Second Act - Crunchyroll, Funimation & Hulu
Yuki Yuna is a Hero: The Great Mankai Chapter - Hidive

Winter 2022
Akebi's Sailor Uniform - Crunchyroll & Funimation
Arifureta: From Commonplace to World's Strongest Season 2 - Funimation & Hulu
Attack on Titan Final Season, Part 2 - Crunchyroll, Funimation, Adult Swim & Hulu
The Case Study of Vanitas Part 2 - Crunchyroll, Funimation & Hulu
CUE! - Crunchyroll
Delicious Party Pretty Cure - Crunchyroll
Fantasia Sango - Realm of Legends - Funimation
Futsal Boys!!!!! - Funimation
The Genius Prince's Guide to Raising a Nation Out of Debt - Funimation
Girls' Frontline - Funimation
How a Realist Hero Rebuilt the Kingdom Part 2 - Funimation & Hulu
I'm Kodama Kawashiri - Crunchyroll
In the Land of Leadale - Crunchyroll
Life with an Ordinary Guy who Reincarnated into a Total Fantasy Knockout - Crunchyroll
Love of Kill - Crunchyroll
Miss Kuroitsu from the Monster Development Department - Crunchyroll
My Dress-Up Darling - Crunchyroll & Funimation
Orient - Crunchyroll
Police in a Pod - Funimation
Princess Connect! Re:Dive Season 2 - Crunchyroll
Requiem of the Rose King - Funimation
Rusted Armors - Crunchyroll
Sabikui Bisco - Crunchyroll & Funimation
Saiyuki Reload: Zeroin - Hidive
Salaryman's Club - Crunchyroll
Sasaki and Miyano - Funimation
She Professed Herself Pupil of the Wiseman - Funimation
Shenmue - Crunchyroll & Adult Swim
Slow Loop - Funimation
The Strongest Sage With the Weakest Crest - Crunchyroll
Tales of Luminaria: The Fateful Crossroad - Crunchyroll & Funimation
Teasing Master Takagi-san Season 3 - Hidive
Theatre of Darkness: Yamishibai: 10 - Crunchyroll
Tokyo 24th Ward - Crunchyroll & Funimation
Tribe Nine - Funimation
World's End Harem - Crunchyroll

Spring 2022
Due to the Sony acquisition, several series that were acquired by Funimation prior to the merger migrated to Crunchyroll.
3 Seconds Later, He Turned Into a Beast - Coolmic
Aharen-san wa Hakarenai - Crunchyroll
AMAIM Warrior at the Borderline Part 2 - Crunchyroll & Funimation
Aoashi - Crunchyroll
Ascendance of a Bookworm Season 3 - Crunchyroll
Bastard!! Heavy Metal, Dark Fantasy Part 1 - Netflix
Birdie Wing: Golf Girls' Story - Crunchyroll
Black Rock Shooter: Dawn Fall - Disney+ & Hulu
Build Divide -#FFFFFF (Code White)- - Crunchyroll & Funimation
A Couple of Cuckoos - Crunchyroll
Dance Dance Danseur - Crunchyroll
Date A Live IV - Crunchyroll
The Dawn of the Witch - Crunchyroll
Deaimon - Crunchyroll
The Demon Girl Next Door Season 2 - Hidive
Don't Hurt Me, My Healer! - Crunchyroll
Estab-Life - Crunchyroll
The Executioner and Her Way of Life - Hidive
Fanfare of Adolescence - Crunchyroll
The Greatest Demon Lord Is Reborn as a Typical Nobody - Crunchyroll
Healer Girl - Crunchyroll
Heroines Run the Show - Crunchyroll
I'm Quitting Heroing - Hidive
In the Heart of Kunoichi Tsubaki - Crunchyroll
Kaginado Season 2 - Crunchyroll & Hidive
Kaguya-sama: Love is War: Ultra Romantic - Crunchyroll
Kingdom 4 - Crunchyroll
Komi Can't Communicate Season 2 - Netflix
Kotaro Lives Alone - Netflix
Legend of the Galactic Heroes: Die Neue These These - Collision - Crunchyroll
Love After World Domination - Crunchyroll
Love All Play - Crunchyroll
Love Live! Nijigasaki High School Idol Club Season 2 - Crunchyroll
Magia Record: Puella Magi Madoka Magica Side Story Final Season - Crunchyroll & Hidive
Mahjong Soul Pong - Crunchyroll
Miss Shachiku and the Little Baby Ghost - Crunchyroll
Onipan! - Hidive
The Rising of the Shield Hero Season 2 - Crunchyroll & Hulu
RPG Real Estate - Crunchyroll
Science Fell in Love, So I Tried to Prove It Season 2 - Crunchyroll
Shadowverse Flame - Crunchyroll
Shikimori's Not Just a Cutie - Crunchyroll
Shin Ikki Tousen - Crunchyroll
Skeleton Knight in Another World - Crunchyroll
Spriggan - Netflix
Spy × Family - Crunchyroll & Hulu
Thermae Romae Novae - Netflix
Tiger & Bunny 2 Part 1 - Netflix
Tomodachi Game - Crunchyroll
Trapped in a Dating Sim: The World of Otome Games is Tough for Mobs - Crunchyroll
Ya Boy Kongming! - Hidive
Yatogame-chan Kansatsu Nikki Season 4 - Crunchyroll

Summer 2022
Black Summoner - Crunchyroll
Call of the Night - Hidive
Cardfight!! Vanguard will+Dress - Crunchyroll, Hidive & YouTube
Caressing the Nipples of My Hibernating Bear - Coolmic
Chimimo - Hidive
Classroom of the Elite Season 2 - Crunchyroll
Cyberpunk: Edgerunners - Netflix
The Devil Is a Part-Timer! Season 2 - Crunchyroll & Hulu
Doomsday With My Dog (web comic) - Hidive
Dropkick on My Devil! X - Crunchyroll
Engage Kiss - Crunchyroll
Extreme Hearts - Crunchyroll
Fuuto PI - Crunchyroll
Hanabi-chan Is Often Late - Crunchyroll
Harem in the Labyrinth of Another World - Crunchyroll
A Herbivorous Dragon of 5,000 Years Gets Unfairly Villainized - Crunchyroll
Is It Wrong to Try to Pick Up Girls in a Dungeon? IV Part 1 - Hidive
Kakegurui Twin - Netflix
Knights of the Zodiac: Saint Seiya – Battle for Sanctuary - Crunchyroll
Love Live! Superstar!! Season 2 - Crunchyroll
Lucifer and the Biscuit Hammer - Crunchyroll & Hulu
Luminous Witches - Hidive
Lycoris Recoil - Crunchyroll
Made in Abyss: The Golden City of the Scorching Sun - Hidive
The Maid I Hired Recently Is Mysterious - Crunchyroll
Musasi-no - Crunchyroll
My Isekai Life - Hidive
My Stepmom's Daughter Is My Ex - Crunchyroll
Obey Me! Season 2 - Crunchyroll
Orient Part 2 - Crunchyroll
Overlord IV - Crunchyroll
Parallel World Pharmacy - Crunchyroll
Phantom of the Idol - Hidive
Prima Doll - Hidive
The Prince of Tennis II: U-17 World Cup - Crunchyroll
Rent-A-Girlfriend Season 2 - Crunchyroll
Shadows House Season 2 - Crunchyroll
Shine On! Bakumatsu Bad Boys! - Crunchyroll
Shine Post - Hidive
Shoot! Goal to the Future - Crunchyroll
Smile of the Arsnotoria the Animation - Crunchyroll
Teppen—!!! - Crunchyroll
Tokyo Mew Mew New - Hidive
Uncle from Another World - Netflix
Urawa no Usagi-chan Musasino! - Crunchyroll
Utawarerumono: Mask of Truth - Crunchyroll
Vermeil in Gold - Hidive
When Will Ayumu Make His Move? - Hidive
The Yakuza's Guide to Babysitting - Crunchyroll
Yurei Deco - Crunchyroll

Fall 2022

Akiba Maid War - Hidive
All Saints Street - Crunchyroll
Arknights: Prelude to Dawn - Crunchyroll
Beast Tamer - Crunchyroll
Berserk: The Golden Age Arc - Crunchyroll & Hulu
Bibliophile Princess - Hidive
Bleach: Thousand-Year Blood War - Hulu
Blue Lock - Crunchyroll
Bocchi the Rock! - Crunchyroll
Chainsaw Man - Crunchyroll & Hulu
The Daily Life of the Immortal King Season 3 - Bilibili & Crunchyroll
Do It Yourself!! - Crunchyroll
The Eminence in Shadow - Hidive
Encouragement of Climb: Next Summit - Hidive
Golden Kamuy Season 4 - Crunchyroll
Harem Camp! - Coolmic
Housing Complex C - Adult Swim & HBO Max
The Human Crazy University - Crunchyroll
I'm the Villainess, So I'm Taming the Final Boss - Crunchyroll
I've Somehow Gotten Stronger When I Improved My Farm-Related Skills - Hidive
IDOLiSH7 Third Beat! Part 2 - Crunchyroll
KanColle: Let's Meet at Sea - Crunchyroll
Legend of Mana: The Teardrop Crystal - Crunchyroll
Legend of the Galactic Heroes: Die Neue These - Intrigue - Crunchyroll
The Little Lies We All Tell - Crunchyroll
Lookism - Netflix
Love Flops - Hidive
Lupin Zero - Hidive
Management of a Novice Alchemist - Hidive 
Mob Psycho 100 III - Crunchyroll & Hulu
Mobile Suit Gundam: The Witch from Mercury - Crunchyroll
More Than a Married Couple, But Not Lovers - Crunchyroll
Muv-Luv Alternative Season 2 - Crunchyroll
My Hero Academia Season 6 - Crunchyroll & Hulu
My Master Has No Tail - Hidive 
Peter Grill and the Philosopher’s Time: Super Extra - Hidive
Play It Cool, Guys - Crunchyroll
Pop Team Epic Season 2 - Crunchyroll
Raven of the Inner Palace - Crunchyroll
Reincarnated as a Sword - Hidive
Romantic Killer - Netflix
Shinobi no Ittoki - Crunchyroll
Spy × Family Part 2 - Crunchyroll & Hulu
To Your Eternity Season 2 - Crunchyroll
Urusei Yatsura - Hidive
Uzaki-chan Wants to Hang Out! ω - Crunchyroll
VazzRock the Animation - Crunchyroll
Welcome to Demon School! Iruma-kun Season 3 - Crunchyroll
Yowamushi Pedal Limit Break  - Crunchyroll

Winter 2023

Aggretsuko Season 5 - Netflix
The Angel Next Door Spoils Me Rotten - Crunchyroll
Attack on Titan Final Season, Part 3 (1st part) - Crunchyroll, Adult Swim & Hulu
Ayakashi Triangle - Crunchyroll
BOFURI: I Don't Want to Get Hurt, so I'll Max Out My Defense. Season 2 - Crunchyroll & Hulu
Buddy Daddies - Crunchyroll
Bungo Stray Dogs Season 4 - Crunchyroll
By the Grace of the Gods Season 2 - Crunchyroll & Hulu
Campfire Cooking in Another World with My Absurd Skill - Crunchyroll
Cardfight!! Vanguard will+Dress Season 2 - Crunchyroll, Hidive & YouTube
Chillin’ in My 30s after Getting Fired from the Demon King’s Army - Crunchyroll
D4DJ All Mix - Crunchyroll & YouTube
Don't Toy With Me, Miss Nagatoro 2nd Attack - Crunchyroll
Endo and Kobayashi Live! The Latest on Tsundere Villainess Lieselotte - Hidive
Farming Life in Another World - Hidive 
The Fire Hunter - Crunchyroll
Flaglia - Amazon Prime Video
The Fruit of Evolution Season 2 - Crunchyroll
Giant Beasts of Ars - Hidive
Handyman Saitō in Another World - Crunchyroll
High Card - Crunchyroll
The Ice Guy and His Cool Female Colleague - Crunchyroll
The Iceblade Sorcerer Shall Rule the World - Crunchyroll
In/Spectre Season 2 - Crunchyroll
Ippon Again! - Hidive
Is It Wrong to Try to Pick Up Girls in a Dungeon? IV Part 2 - Hidive
Kaina of the Great Snow Sea - Crunchyroll
Kubo Won't Let Me Be Invisible - Hidive (delayed after episode 6)
The Legend of Heroes: Trails of Cold Steel – Northern War - Crunchyroll
The Magical Revolution of the Reincarnated Princess and the Genius Young Lady - Crunchyroll
Malevolent Spirits - Crunchyroll
The Misfit of Demon King Academy Season 2, Part 1 - Crunchyroll (delayed after episode 7)
My Life as Inukai-san's Dog - Hidive
Nier: Automata Ver1.1a - Crunchyroll
Nijiyon Animation - Crunchyroll & YouTube
Ningen Fushin: Adventurers Who Don't Believe in Humanity Will Save the World - Crunchyroll
Oh, Suddenly Egyptian God Season 2 - Crunchyroll
Onimai: I'm Now Your Sister! - Crunchyroll
Reborn to Master the Blade: From Hero-King to Extraordinary Squire - Crunchyroll
Record of Ragnarok Season 2 - Netflix 
The Reincarnation of the Strongest Exorcist in Another World - Crunchyroll
Revenger - Crunchyroll
Saving 80,000 Gold in Another World for My Retirement - Crunchyroll
Soaring Sky! Pretty Cure - Crunchyroll
Sorcerous Stabber Orphen: Chaos in Urbanrama - Crunchyroll
Spy Classroom - Hidive
Sugar Apple Fairy Tale - Crunchyroll
The Tale of the Outcasts - Crunchyroll
Technoroid Overmind- Crunchyroll
Tokyo Revengers: Christmas Showdown - Disney+ & Hulu
Tomo-chan Is a Girl! - Crunchyroll
Trigun Stampede - Crunchyroll & Hulu
Tsurune Season 2 - Hidive
UniteUp! - Crunchyroll
The Vampire Dies in No Time Season 2 - Crunchyroll
Vinland Saga Season 2 - Crunchyroll & Netflix
The Way of the Househusband Season 2 - Netflix

Spring 2023

A Galaxy Next Door - Crunchyroll
Alice Gear Aegis Expansion - Hidive 
The Ancient Magus' Bride Season 2 - Crunchyroll
Birdie Wing: Golf Girls' Story Season 2 - Crunchyroll
Chronicles of an Aristocrat Reborn in Another World - Crunchyroll
The Dangers in My Heart - Hidive 
Dead Mount Death Play Part 1 - Crunchyroll
Demon Slayer: Kimetsu no Yaiba – Swordsmith Village Arc - Crunchyroll & Hulu
Dr. Stone: New World - Crunchyroll
Edens Zero Season 2 - Netflix
Gunma-chan Season 2 - Crunchyroll
Heavenly Delusion - Hulu 
Hell's Paradise: Jigokuraku - Crunchyroll
In Another World With My Smartphone Season 2 - Crunchyroll
Insomniacs After School - Hidive
KamiKatsu: Working for God in a Godless World - Crunchyroll
KonoSuba: An Explosion on This Wonderful World! - Crunchyroll
Kuma Kuma Kuma Bear Punch! - Crunchyroll & Hulu
The Legendary Hero Is Dead! - Crunchyroll
Mashle: Magic and Muscles - Crunchyroll 
MIX Season 2 - Crunchyroll & Hulu
Mobile Suit Gundam: The Witch from Mercury Part 2 - Crunchyroll
My Clueless First Friend - Crunchyroll
My Home Hero - Crunchyroll
My One-Hit Kill Sister - Crunchyroll 
Oshi no Ko - Hidive
Otaku Elf - Hidive 
The Reason Why Raeliana Ended up at the Duke's Mansion - Crunchyroll
 Rokudo's Bad Girls - Crunchyroll 
Sacrificial Princess and the King of Beasts - Crunchyroll
Skip and Loafer - Crunchyroll
Tokyo Mew Mew New Season 2 - Hidive
TONIKAWA: Over the Moon for You Season 2 - Crunchyroll
Too Cute Crisis - Hidive 
Uma Musume Pretty Derby Season 3 - Crunchyroll
Yuri Is My Job! - Crunchyroll

Summer 2023

Bleach: Thousand-Year Blood War Part 2 - Hulu
Cardfight!! Vanguard will+Dress Season 3 - Crunchyroll, Hidive & YouTube
The Duke of Death and His Maid Season 2 - Crunchyroll
Helck - Hidive
Jujutsu Kaisen Season 2 - Crunchyroll
Masamune-kun's Revenge R - Crunchyroll
The Most Heretical Last Boss Queen - Hidive
My Happy Marriage - Netflix
 Reborn as a Vending Machine, I Now Wander the Dungeon - Crunchyroll
Rent-A-Girlfriend Season 3 - Crunchyroll
Saint Cecilia and Pastor Lawrence - Crunchyroll
Zom 100: Bucket List of the Dead - Hulu

Fall 2023

Dead Mount Death Play Part 2 - Crunchyroll
Shangri-La Frontier - Crunchyroll

Notes 

Anime industry